

189001–189100 

|-bgcolor=#d6d6d6
| 189001 || 4889 P-L || — || September 24, 1960 || Palomar || PLS || — || align=right | 3.4 km || 
|-id=002 bgcolor=#fefefe
| 189002 || 6760 P-L || — || September 24, 1960 || Palomar || PLS || NYS || align=right data-sort-value="0.89" | 890 m || 
|-id=003 bgcolor=#d6d6d6
| 189003 || 3009 T-3 || — || October 16, 1977 || Palomar || PLS || — || align=right | 4.9 km || 
|-id=004 bgcolor=#C2FFFF
| 189004 Capys || 3184 T-3 ||  || October 16, 1977 || Palomar || PLS || L5 || align=right | 11 km || 
|-id=005 bgcolor=#E9E9E9
| 189005 || 5176 T-3 || — || October 16, 1977 || Palomar || PLS || — || align=right | 3.3 km || 
|-id=006 bgcolor=#E9E9E9
| 189006 ||  || — || November 9, 1993 || Kitt Peak || Spacewatch || — || align=right | 3.7 km || 
|-id=007 bgcolor=#E9E9E9
| 189007 ||  || — || March 25, 1995 || Kitt Peak || Spacewatch || — || align=right | 2.3 km || 
|-id=008 bgcolor=#FFC2E0
| 189008 ||  || — || March 26, 1996 || Haleakala || NEAT || APO +1km || align=right | 2.0 km || 
|-id=009 bgcolor=#fefefe
| 189009 ||  || — || January 31, 1997 || Kitt Peak || Spacewatch || — || align=right data-sort-value="0.95" | 950 m || 
|-id=010 bgcolor=#fefefe
| 189010 ||  || — || May 30, 1997 || Kitt Peak || Spacewatch || — || align=right | 1.1 km || 
|-id=011 bgcolor=#FFC2E0
| 189011 Ogmios ||  ||  || July 8, 1997 || Caussols || ODAS || AMO || align=right data-sort-value="0.55" | 550 m || 
|-id=012 bgcolor=#FA8072
| 189012 ||  || — || March 31, 1998 || Socorro || LINEAR || — || align=right | 1.1 km || 
|-id=013 bgcolor=#FA8072
| 189013 ||  || — || August 17, 1998 || Socorro || LINEAR || — || align=right | 1.2 km || 
|-id=014 bgcolor=#fefefe
| 189014 ||  || — || August 25, 1998 || Caussols || ODAS || — || align=right | 1.2 km || 
|-id=015 bgcolor=#FA8072
| 189015 ||  || — || August 24, 1998 || Socorro || LINEAR || — || align=right | 1.0 km || 
|-id=016 bgcolor=#d6d6d6
| 189016 ||  || — || September 14, 1998 || Socorro || LINEAR || — || align=right | 4.2 km || 
|-id=017 bgcolor=#d6d6d6
| 189017 ||  || — || September 26, 1998 || Socorro || LINEAR || — || align=right | 5.4 km || 
|-id=018 bgcolor=#d6d6d6
| 189018 Guokeda ||  ||  || October 14, 1998 || Xinglong || SCAP || — || align=right | 5.8 km || 
|-id=019 bgcolor=#d6d6d6
| 189019 ||  || — || November 10, 1998 || Socorro || LINEAR || — || align=right | 5.3 km || 
|-id=020 bgcolor=#E9E9E9
| 189020 ||  || — || December 17, 1998 || Višnjan Observatory || K. Korlević || — || align=right | 3.0 km || 
|-id=021 bgcolor=#fefefe
| 189021 ||  || — || February 12, 1999 || Socorro || LINEAR || H || align=right | 1.2 km || 
|-id=022 bgcolor=#E9E9E9
| 189022 ||  || — || May 12, 1999 || Socorro || LINEAR || — || align=right | 2.9 km || 
|-id=023 bgcolor=#E9E9E9
| 189023 ||  || — || July 14, 1999 || Socorro || LINEAR || PALfast? || align=right | 3.4 km || 
|-id=024 bgcolor=#E9E9E9
| 189024 ||  || — || September 9, 1999 || Socorro || LINEAR || DOR || align=right | 4.0 km || 
|-id=025 bgcolor=#fefefe
| 189025 ||  || — || September 9, 1999 || Socorro || LINEAR || — || align=right data-sort-value="0.88" | 880 m || 
|-id=026 bgcolor=#E9E9E9
| 189026 ||  || — || September 11, 1999 || Anderson Mesa || LONEOS || — || align=right | 3.9 km || 
|-id=027 bgcolor=#E9E9E9
| 189027 ||  || — || September 29, 1999 || Catalina || CSS || — || align=right | 4.4 km || 
|-id=028 bgcolor=#d6d6d6
| 189028 ||  || — || October 14, 1999 || Socorro || LINEAR || — || align=right | 5.6 km || 
|-id=029 bgcolor=#d6d6d6
| 189029 ||  || — || October 31, 1999 || Catalina || CSS || EMA || align=right | 5.5 km || 
|-id=030 bgcolor=#fefefe
| 189030 ||  || — || December 4, 1999 || Catalina || CSS || — || align=right | 1.2 km || 
|-id=031 bgcolor=#d6d6d6
| 189031 ||  || — || December 7, 1999 || Socorro || LINEAR || — || align=right | 4.3 km || 
|-id=032 bgcolor=#d6d6d6
| 189032 ||  || — || December 11, 1999 || Socorro || LINEAR || — || align=right | 6.0 km || 
|-id=033 bgcolor=#d6d6d6
| 189033 ||  || — || January 2, 2000 || Socorro || LINEAR || — || align=right | 6.2 km || 
|-id=034 bgcolor=#fefefe
| 189034 ||  || — || January 9, 2000 || Kitt Peak || Spacewatch || — || align=right | 1.3 km || 
|-id=035 bgcolor=#d6d6d6
| 189035 Michaelsummers ||  ||  || February 5, 2000 || Kitt Peak || M. W. Buie || EUP || align=right | 6.6 km || 
|-id=036 bgcolor=#fefefe
| 189036 ||  || — || March 10, 2000 || Socorro || LINEAR || — || align=right | 1.7 km || 
|-id=037 bgcolor=#fefefe
| 189037 ||  || — || April 6, 2000 || Socorro || LINEAR || H || align=right | 1.1 km || 
|-id=038 bgcolor=#fefefe
| 189038 ||  || — || May 29, 2000 || Socorro || LINEAR || SVE || align=right | 3.0 km || 
|-id=039 bgcolor=#fefefe
| 189039 ||  || — || June 1, 2000 || Socorro || LINEAR || — || align=right | 4.6 km || 
|-id=040 bgcolor=#FFC2E0
| 189040 ||  || — || June 24, 2000 || Socorro || LINEAR || APOPHA || align=right data-sort-value="0.38" | 380 m || 
|-id=041 bgcolor=#fefefe
| 189041 ||  || — || July 24, 2000 || Eskridge || G. Hug || H || align=right | 1.0 km || 
|-id=042 bgcolor=#E9E9E9
| 189042 ||  || — || July 30, 2000 || Socorro || LINEAR || — || align=right | 3.3 km || 
|-id=043 bgcolor=#E9E9E9
| 189043 ||  || — || July 23, 2000 || Socorro || LINEAR || — || align=right | 1.9 km || 
|-id=044 bgcolor=#E9E9E9
| 189044 ||  || — || August 1, 2000 || Eskridge || G. Hug || EUN || align=right | 3.3 km || 
|-id=045 bgcolor=#E9E9E9
| 189045 ||  || — || August 24, 2000 || Socorro || LINEAR || — || align=right | 2.4 km || 
|-id=046 bgcolor=#E9E9E9
| 189046 ||  || — || August 25, 2000 || Socorro || LINEAR || — || align=right | 2.4 km || 
|-id=047 bgcolor=#fefefe
| 189047 ||  || — || August 29, 2000 || Socorro || LINEAR || H || align=right | 1.0 km || 
|-id=048 bgcolor=#E9E9E9
| 189048 ||  || — || August 31, 2000 || Socorro || LINEAR || — || align=right | 2.0 km || 
|-id=049 bgcolor=#E9E9E9
| 189049 ||  || — || August 31, 2000 || Socorro || LINEAR || — || align=right | 2.2 km || 
|-id=050 bgcolor=#E9E9E9
| 189050 ||  || — || September 1, 2000 || Socorro || LINEAR || EUN || align=right | 2.2 km || 
|-id=051 bgcolor=#E9E9E9
| 189051 ||  || — || September 5, 2000 || Anderson Mesa || LONEOS || MAR || align=right | 2.1 km || 
|-id=052 bgcolor=#d6d6d6
| 189052 ||  || — || September 24, 2000 || Socorro || LINEAR || — || align=right | 4.8 km || 
|-id=053 bgcolor=#E9E9E9
| 189053 ||  || — || September 27, 2000 || Socorro || LINEAR || EUN || align=right | 2.5 km || 
|-id=054 bgcolor=#FA8072
| 189054 ||  || — || September 30, 2000 || Socorro || LINEAR || — || align=right | 2.4 km || 
|-id=055 bgcolor=#E9E9E9
| 189055 ||  || — || September 25, 2000 || Socorro || LINEAR || — || align=right | 2.3 km || 
|-id=056 bgcolor=#E9E9E9
| 189056 ||  || — || September 20, 2000 || Socorro || LINEAR || — || align=right | 2.0 km || 
|-id=057 bgcolor=#E9E9E9
| 189057 ||  || — || October 3, 2000 || Socorro || LINEAR || — || align=right | 1.8 km || 
|-id=058 bgcolor=#FFC2E0
| 189058 ||  || — || October 29, 2000 || Socorro || LINEAR || AMO +1km || align=right | 1.8 km || 
|-id=059 bgcolor=#E9E9E9
| 189059 ||  || — || October 25, 2000 || Socorro || LINEAR || — || align=right | 3.3 km || 
|-id=060 bgcolor=#E9E9E9
| 189060 ||  || — || October 25, 2000 || Socorro || LINEAR || MAR || align=right | 2.2 km || 
|-id=061 bgcolor=#E9E9E9
| 189061 ||  || — || October 31, 2000 || Socorro || LINEAR || EUN || align=right | 2.1 km || 
|-id=062 bgcolor=#FFC2E0
| 189062 ||  || — || November 2, 2000 || Socorro || LINEAR || AMOcritical || align=right data-sort-value="0.74" | 740 m || 
|-id=063 bgcolor=#E9E9E9
| 189063 ||  || — || November 3, 2000 || Socorro || LINEAR || — || align=right | 2.8 km || 
|-id=064 bgcolor=#E9E9E9
| 189064 ||  || — || November 20, 2000 || Socorro || LINEAR || EUN || align=right | 2.5 km || 
|-id=065 bgcolor=#E9E9E9
| 189065 ||  || — || November 20, 2000 || Socorro || LINEAR || — || align=right | 3.2 km || 
|-id=066 bgcolor=#E9E9E9
| 189066 ||  || — || November 20, 2000 || Socorro || LINEAR || — || align=right | 3.0 km || 
|-id=067 bgcolor=#E9E9E9
| 189067 ||  || — || November 19, 2000 || Socorro || LINEAR || ADE || align=right | 3.9 km || 
|-id=068 bgcolor=#E9E9E9
| 189068 ||  || — || November 25, 2000 || Socorro || LINEAR || — || align=right | 3.3 km || 
|-id=069 bgcolor=#E9E9E9
| 189069 ||  || — || December 26, 2000 || Haleakala || NEAT || ADE || align=right | 3.4 km || 
|-id=070 bgcolor=#d6d6d6
| 189070 ||  || — || January 19, 2001 || Kitt Peak || Spacewatch || HYG || align=right | 3.8 km || 
|-id=071 bgcolor=#d6d6d6
| 189071 ||  || — || January 18, 2001 || Socorro || LINEAR || EUP || align=right | 6.1 km || 
|-id=072 bgcolor=#d6d6d6
| 189072 ||  || — || February 16, 2001 || Kitt Peak || Spacewatch || THM || align=right | 2.7 km || 
|-id=073 bgcolor=#d6d6d6
| 189073 ||  || — || February 16, 2001 || Socorro || LINEAR || — || align=right | 5.9 km || 
|-id=074 bgcolor=#d6d6d6
| 189074 ||  || — || February 19, 2001 || Socorro || LINEAR || — || align=right | 5.6 km || 
|-id=075 bgcolor=#d6d6d6
| 189075 ||  || — || February 16, 2001 || Anderson Mesa || LONEOS || — || align=right | 6.2 km || 
|-id=076 bgcolor=#d6d6d6
| 189076 || 2001 HN || — || April 16, 2001 || Emerald Lane || L. Ball || — || align=right | 8.2 km || 
|-id=077 bgcolor=#fefefe
| 189077 ||  || — || April 18, 2001 || Socorro || LINEAR || — || align=right data-sort-value="0.98" | 980 m || 
|-id=078 bgcolor=#fefefe
| 189078 ||  || — || May 22, 2001 || Socorro || LINEAR || — || align=right | 1.5 km || 
|-id=079 bgcolor=#fefefe
| 189079 ||  || — || May 26, 2001 || Socorro || LINEAR || — || align=right | 2.4 km || 
|-id=080 bgcolor=#FA8072
| 189080 ||  || — || June 21, 2001 || Palomar || NEAT || — || align=right | 1.4 km || 
|-id=081 bgcolor=#fefefe
| 189081 ||  || — || June 27, 2001 || Palomar || NEAT || — || align=right | 1.2 km || 
|-id=082 bgcolor=#fefefe
| 189082 ||  || — || July 20, 2001 || Palomar || NEAT || — || align=right | 1.4 km || 
|-id=083 bgcolor=#FA8072
| 189083 ||  || — || July 16, 2001 || Anderson Mesa || LONEOS || — || align=right | 1.6 km || 
|-id=084 bgcolor=#fefefe
| 189084 ||  || — || July 21, 2001 || Haleakala || NEAT || NYS || align=right | 1.2 km || 
|-id=085 bgcolor=#fefefe
| 189085 ||  || — || July 21, 2001 || Haleakala || NEAT || — || align=right | 1.1 km || 
|-id=086 bgcolor=#fefefe
| 189086 ||  || — || July 23, 2001 || Haleakala || NEAT || — || align=right | 1.6 km || 
|-id=087 bgcolor=#fefefe
| 189087 ||  || — || August 13, 2001 || San Marcello || A. Boattini, L. Tesi || NYS || align=right | 1.4 km || 
|-id=088 bgcolor=#fefefe
| 189088 ||  || — || August 9, 2001 || Palomar || NEAT || — || align=right | 1.5 km || 
|-id=089 bgcolor=#fefefe
| 189089 ||  || — || August 12, 2001 || Palomar || NEAT || PHO || align=right | 1.7 km || 
|-id=090 bgcolor=#fefefe
| 189090 ||  || — || August 16, 2001 || Socorro || LINEAR || NYS || align=right | 1.2 km || 
|-id=091 bgcolor=#fefefe
| 189091 ||  || — || August 16, 2001 || Socorro || LINEAR || — || align=right | 1.7 km || 
|-id=092 bgcolor=#fefefe
| 189092 ||  || — || August 17, 2001 || Socorro || LINEAR || — || align=right | 1.3 km || 
|-id=093 bgcolor=#fefefe
| 189093 ||  || — || August 21, 2001 || Haleakala || NEAT || NYS || align=right | 1.2 km || 
|-id=094 bgcolor=#fefefe
| 189094 ||  || — || August 25, 2001 || Palomar || NEAT || — || align=right | 1.5 km || 
|-id=095 bgcolor=#E9E9E9
| 189095 ||  || — || August 23, 2001 || Anderson Mesa || LONEOS || — || align=right | 1.9 km || 
|-id=096 bgcolor=#fefefe
| 189096 ||  || — || August 24, 2001 || Anderson Mesa || LONEOS || FLO || align=right | 1.3 km || 
|-id=097 bgcolor=#fefefe
| 189097 ||  || — || August 24, 2001 || Socorro || LINEAR || MAS || align=right | 1.1 km || 
|-id=098 bgcolor=#fefefe
| 189098 ||  || — || August 19, 2001 || Socorro || LINEAR || — || align=right | 1.2 km || 
|-id=099 bgcolor=#fefefe
| 189099 || 2001 RO || — || September 7, 2001 || Socorro || LINEAR || — || align=right | 4.2 km || 
|-id=100 bgcolor=#E9E9E9
| 189100 ||  || — || September 12, 2001 || Socorro || LINEAR || — || align=right | 2.2 km || 
|}

189101–189200 

|-bgcolor=#fefefe
| 189101 ||  || — || September 12, 2001 || Socorro || LINEAR || NYS || align=right | 1.2 km || 
|-id=102 bgcolor=#fefefe
| 189102 ||  || — || September 16, 2001 || Socorro || LINEAR || NYS || align=right | 1.0 km || 
|-id=103 bgcolor=#fefefe
| 189103 ||  || — || September 16, 2001 || Socorro || LINEAR || MAS || align=right | 1.0 km || 
|-id=104 bgcolor=#fefefe
| 189104 ||  || — || September 20, 2001 || Socorro || LINEAR || NYS || align=right data-sort-value="0.83" | 830 m || 
|-id=105 bgcolor=#fefefe
| 189105 ||  || — || September 20, 2001 || Socorro || LINEAR || — || align=right | 2.0 km || 
|-id=106 bgcolor=#fefefe
| 189106 ||  || — || September 19, 2001 || Socorro || LINEAR || — || align=right | 1.4 km || 
|-id=107 bgcolor=#fefefe
| 189107 ||  || — || September 21, 2001 || Anderson Mesa || LONEOS || — || align=right | 1.9 km || 
|-id=108 bgcolor=#fefefe
| 189108 ||  || — || September 20, 2001 || Socorro || LINEAR || NYS || align=right data-sort-value="0.92" | 920 m || 
|-id=109 bgcolor=#fefefe
| 189109 ||  || — || October 14, 2001 || Socorro || LINEAR || — || align=right | 1.3 km || 
|-id=110 bgcolor=#fefefe
| 189110 ||  || — || October 15, 2001 || Socorro || LINEAR || — || align=right | 1.9 km || 
|-id=111 bgcolor=#fefefe
| 189111 ||  || — || October 12, 2001 || Haleakala || NEAT || — || align=right | 1.6 km || 
|-id=112 bgcolor=#fefefe
| 189112 ||  || — || October 16, 2001 || Palomar || NEAT || — || align=right | 1.1 km || 
|-id=113 bgcolor=#fefefe
| 189113 ||  || — || October 23, 2001 || Socorro || LINEAR || MAS || align=right | 1.4 km || 
|-id=114 bgcolor=#d6d6d6
| 189114 ||  || — || October 23, 2001 || Palomar || NEAT || HIL3:2 || align=right | 9.0 km || 
|-id=115 bgcolor=#E9E9E9
| 189115 ||  || — || October 19, 2001 || Socorro || LINEAR || — || align=right | 2.9 km || 
|-id=116 bgcolor=#E9E9E9
| 189116 ||  || — || October 19, 2001 || Kitt Peak || Spacewatch || — || align=right | 2.1 km || 
|-id=117 bgcolor=#fefefe
| 189117 ||  || — || November 11, 2001 || Socorro || LINEAR || H || align=right | 1.0 km || 
|-id=118 bgcolor=#FA8072
| 189118 ||  || — || November 9, 2001 || Socorro || LINEAR || — || align=right | 2.5 km || 
|-id=119 bgcolor=#E9E9E9
| 189119 ||  || — || November 15, 2001 || Socorro || LINEAR || — || align=right | 1.2 km || 
|-id=120 bgcolor=#fefefe
| 189120 ||  || — || November 17, 2001 || Socorro || LINEAR || — || align=right | 1.6 km || 
|-id=121 bgcolor=#fefefe
| 189121 ||  || — || November 17, 2001 || Socorro || LINEAR || H || align=right | 1.0 km || 
|-id=122 bgcolor=#E9E9E9
| 189122 ||  || — || November 19, 2001 || Socorro || LINEAR || — || align=right | 3.6 km || 
|-id=123 bgcolor=#E9E9E9
| 189123 ||  || — || November 20, 2001 || Socorro || LINEAR || — || align=right | 1.8 km || 
|-id=124 bgcolor=#E9E9E9
| 189124 ||  || — || December 9, 2001 || Socorro || LINEAR || EUN || align=right | 2.3 km || 
|-id=125 bgcolor=#fefefe
| 189125 ||  || — || December 10, 2001 || Socorro || LINEAR || NYS || align=right | 1.3 km || 
|-id=126 bgcolor=#E9E9E9
| 189126 ||  || — || December 11, 2001 || Socorro || LINEAR || — || align=right | 2.3 km || 
|-id=127 bgcolor=#E9E9E9
| 189127 ||  || — || December 11, 2001 || Socorro || LINEAR || — || align=right | 2.3 km || 
|-id=128 bgcolor=#fefefe
| 189128 ||  || — || December 14, 2001 || Socorro || LINEAR || NYS || align=right | 1.2 km || 
|-id=129 bgcolor=#fefefe
| 189129 ||  || — || December 14, 2001 || Socorro || LINEAR || — || align=right | 5.1 km || 
|-id=130 bgcolor=#fefefe
| 189130 ||  || — || December 14, 2001 || Socorro || LINEAR || — || align=right | 2.5 km || 
|-id=131 bgcolor=#E9E9E9
| 189131 ||  || — || December 13, 2001 || Socorro || LINEAR || — || align=right | 1.5 km || 
|-id=132 bgcolor=#E9E9E9
| 189132 ||  || — || December 17, 2001 || Socorro || LINEAR || — || align=right | 1.7 km || 
|-id=133 bgcolor=#fefefe
| 189133 ||  || — || December 19, 2001 || Socorro || LINEAR || — || align=right | 2.3 km || 
|-id=134 bgcolor=#fefefe
| 189134 ||  || — || January 9, 2002 || Socorro || LINEAR || H || align=right | 1.4 km || 
|-id=135 bgcolor=#E9E9E9
| 189135 ||  || — || January 13, 2002 || Socorro || LINEAR || — || align=right | 3.9 km || 
|-id=136 bgcolor=#E9E9E9
| 189136 ||  || — || January 20, 2002 || Anderson Mesa || LONEOS || EUN || align=right | 2.8 km || 
|-id=137 bgcolor=#fefefe
| 189137 ||  || — || February 8, 2002 || Socorro || LINEAR || H || align=right | 1.4 km || 
|-id=138 bgcolor=#d6d6d6
| 189138 ||  || — || February 12, 2002 || Desert Eagle || W. K. Y. Yeung || — || align=right | 3.5 km || 
|-id=139 bgcolor=#E9E9E9
| 189139 ||  || — || February 7, 2002 || Socorro || LINEAR || — || align=right | 2.6 km || 
|-id=140 bgcolor=#d6d6d6
| 189140 ||  || — || February 8, 2002 || Socorro || LINEAR || — || align=right | 4.1 km || 
|-id=141 bgcolor=#d6d6d6
| 189141 ||  || — || February 19, 2002 || Socorro || LINEAR || — || align=right | 6.7 km || 
|-id=142 bgcolor=#d6d6d6
| 189142 ||  || — || March 21, 2002 || Anderson Mesa || LONEOS || — || align=right | 4.5 km || 
|-id=143 bgcolor=#d6d6d6
| 189143 ||  || — || April 2, 2002 || Kvistaberg || UDAS || — || align=right | 5.0 km || 
|-id=144 bgcolor=#d6d6d6
| 189144 ||  || — || April 12, 2002 || Desert Eagle || W. K. Y. Yeung || EUP || align=right | 7.6 km || 
|-id=145 bgcolor=#d6d6d6
| 189145 ||  || — || April 4, 2002 || Haleakala || NEAT || — || align=right | 5.5 km || 
|-id=146 bgcolor=#d6d6d6
| 189146 ||  || — || April 8, 2002 || Socorro || LINEAR || — || align=right | 4.8 km || 
|-id=147 bgcolor=#d6d6d6
| 189147 ||  || — || April 13, 2002 || Palomar || NEAT || — || align=right | 4.5 km || 
|-id=148 bgcolor=#d6d6d6
| 189148 ||  || — || April 13, 2002 || Palomar || NEAT || — || align=right | 5.4 km || 
|-id=149 bgcolor=#d6d6d6
| 189149 ||  || — || April 11, 2002 || Socorro || LINEAR || — || align=right | 4.7 km || 
|-id=150 bgcolor=#d6d6d6
| 189150 ||  || — || April 20, 2002 || Kitt Peak || Spacewatch || fast? || align=right | 3.6 km || 
|-id=151 bgcolor=#d6d6d6
| 189151 ||  || — || May 3, 2002 || Desert Eagle || W. K. Y. Yeung || — || align=right | 5.0 km || 
|-id=152 bgcolor=#d6d6d6
| 189152 ||  || — || May 7, 2002 || Socorro || LINEAR || EUP || align=right | 8.1 km || 
|-id=153 bgcolor=#d6d6d6
| 189153 ||  || — || May 7, 2002 || Socorro || LINEAR || — || align=right | 6.2 km || 
|-id=154 bgcolor=#d6d6d6
| 189154 ||  || — || May 9, 2002 || Socorro || LINEAR || — || align=right | 6.0 km || 
|-id=155 bgcolor=#d6d6d6
| 189155 ||  || — || May 9, 2002 || Socorro || LINEAR || ALA || align=right | 9.7 km || 
|-id=156 bgcolor=#d6d6d6
| 189156 ||  || — || May 4, 2002 || Anderson Mesa || LONEOS || — || align=right | 6.0 km || 
|-id=157 bgcolor=#d6d6d6
| 189157 ||  || — || May 5, 2002 || Anderson Mesa || LONEOS || — || align=right | 5.1 km || 
|-id=158 bgcolor=#fefefe
| 189158 ||  || — || May 9, 2002 || Palomar || NEAT || NYS || align=right | 2.6 km || 
|-id=159 bgcolor=#d6d6d6
| 189159 ||  || — || June 6, 2002 || Socorro || LINEAR || TIR || align=right | 5.3 km || 
|-id=160 bgcolor=#d6d6d6
| 189160 ||  || — || June 3, 2002 || Socorro || LINEAR || — || align=right | 6.3 km || 
|-id=161 bgcolor=#fefefe
| 189161 ||  || — || August 17, 2002 || Socorro || LINEAR || PHO || align=right | 2.3 km || 
|-id=162 bgcolor=#d6d6d6
| 189162 ||  || — || August 17, 2002 || Palomar || NEAT || AEG || align=right | 5.9 km || 
|-id=163 bgcolor=#fefefe
| 189163 ||  || — || September 6, 2002 || Socorro || LINEAR || — || align=right | 1.3 km || 
|-id=164 bgcolor=#fefefe
| 189164 ||  || — || October 1, 2002 || Anderson Mesa || LONEOS || FLO || align=right data-sort-value="0.79" | 790 m || 
|-id=165 bgcolor=#FA8072
| 189165 ||  || — || October 11, 2002 || Socorro || LINEAR || — || align=right | 1.2 km || 
|-id=166 bgcolor=#FA8072
| 189166 ||  || — || October 8, 2002 || Anderson Mesa || LONEOS || — || align=right | 1.1 km || 
|-id=167 bgcolor=#fefefe
| 189167 ||  || — || October 10, 2002 || Socorro || LINEAR || — || align=right | 1.2 km || 
|-id=168 bgcolor=#fefefe
| 189168 ||  || — || November 5, 2002 || Socorro || LINEAR || — || align=right | 1.0 km || 
|-id=169 bgcolor=#fefefe
| 189169 ||  || — || November 5, 2002 || Socorro || LINEAR || — || align=right | 1.3 km || 
|-id=170 bgcolor=#FA8072
| 189170 ||  || — || November 8, 2002 || Socorro || LINEAR || — || align=right data-sort-value="0.87" | 870 m || 
|-id=171 bgcolor=#fefefe
| 189171 ||  || — || November 8, 2002 || Socorro || LINEAR || — || align=right | 1.2 km || 
|-id=172 bgcolor=#fefefe
| 189172 ||  || — || November 6, 2002 || Anderson Mesa || LONEOS || — || align=right | 1.1 km || 
|-id=173 bgcolor=#FFC2E0
| 189173 ||  || — || December 5, 2002 || Socorro || LINEAR || APO || align=right data-sort-value="0.59" | 590 m || 
|-id=174 bgcolor=#fefefe
| 189174 ||  || — || December 5, 2002 || Fountain Hills || Fountain Hills Obs. || — || align=right | 1.4 km || 
|-id=175 bgcolor=#fefefe
| 189175 ||  || — || December 10, 2002 || Socorro || LINEAR || FLO || align=right data-sort-value="0.91" | 910 m || 
|-id=176 bgcolor=#fefefe
| 189176 ||  || — || December 1, 2002 || Socorro || LINEAR || PHO || align=right | 2.1 km || 
|-id=177 bgcolor=#d6d6d6
| 189177 ||  || — || December 10, 2002 || Palomar || NEAT || — || align=right | 4.3 km || 
|-id=178 bgcolor=#fefefe
| 189178 ||  || — || December 31, 2002 || Socorro || LINEAR || — || align=right | 1.7 km || 
|-id=179 bgcolor=#E9E9E9
| 189179 ||  || — || December 31, 2002 || Socorro || LINEAR || — || align=right | 1.7 km || 
|-id=180 bgcolor=#fefefe
| 189180 ||  || — || January 3, 2003 || Eskridge || Farpoint Obs. || FLO || align=right data-sort-value="0.94" | 940 m || 
|-id=181 bgcolor=#E9E9E9
| 189181 ||  || — || January 7, 2003 || Socorro || LINEAR || — || align=right | 2.3 km || 
|-id=182 bgcolor=#fefefe
| 189182 ||  || — || January 26, 2003 || Haleakala || NEAT || FLO || align=right | 1.4 km || 
|-id=183 bgcolor=#E9E9E9
| 189183 ||  || — || January 26, 2003 || Haleakala || NEAT || — || align=right | 2.1 km || 
|-id=184 bgcolor=#fefefe
| 189184 ||  || — || January 27, 2003 || Anderson Mesa || LONEOS || — || align=right | 1.4 km || 
|-id=185 bgcolor=#E9E9E9
| 189185 ||  || — || February 1, 2003 || Anderson Mesa || LONEOS || — || align=right | 2.2 km || 
|-id=186 bgcolor=#E9E9E9
| 189186 ||  || — || February 9, 2003 || Palomar || NEAT || — || align=right | 1.9 km || 
|-id=187 bgcolor=#E9E9E9
| 189187 ||  || — || March 6, 2003 || Anderson Mesa || LONEOS || JUN || align=right | 1.8 km || 
|-id=188 bgcolor=#E9E9E9
| 189188 Floraliën ||  ||  || March 27, 2003 || Uccle || T. Pauwels || — || align=right | 5.9 km || 
|-id=189 bgcolor=#E9E9E9
| 189189 ||  || — || March 23, 2003 || Palomar || NEAT || — || align=right | 2.2 km || 
|-id=190 bgcolor=#E9E9E9
| 189190 ||  || — || March 24, 2003 || Haleakala || NEAT || — || align=right | 3.3 km || 
|-id=191 bgcolor=#E9E9E9
| 189191 ||  || — || March 25, 2003 || Haleakala || NEAT || — || align=right | 2.9 km || 
|-id=192 bgcolor=#E9E9E9
| 189192 ||  || — || March 27, 2003 || Palomar || NEAT || — || align=right | 3.3 km || 
|-id=193 bgcolor=#d6d6d6
| 189193 ||  || — || March 30, 2003 || Kitt Peak || Spacewatch || — || align=right | 3.2 km || 
|-id=194 bgcolor=#fefefe
| 189194 ||  || — || June 1, 2003 || Reedy Creek || J. Broughton || H || align=right | 1.5 km || 
|-id=195 bgcolor=#d6d6d6
| 189195 ||  || — || August 1, 2003 || Socorro || LINEAR || ALA || align=right | 6.1 km || 
|-id=196 bgcolor=#d6d6d6
| 189196 ||  || — || August 21, 2003 || Campo Imperatore || CINEOS || — || align=right | 4.6 km || 
|-id=197 bgcolor=#d6d6d6
| 189197 ||  || — || August 23, 2003 || Socorro || LINEAR || LIX || align=right | 8.3 km || 
|-id=198 bgcolor=#d6d6d6
| 189198 ||  || — || August 25, 2003 || Palomar || NEAT || — || align=right | 4.3 km || 
|-id=199 bgcolor=#d6d6d6
| 189199 ||  || — || September 2, 2003 || Socorro || LINEAR || THM || align=right | 5.3 km || 
|-id=200 bgcolor=#d6d6d6
| 189200 ||  || — || September 4, 2003 || Reedy Creek || J. Broughton || — || align=right | 4.8 km || 
|}

189201–189300 

|-bgcolor=#d6d6d6
| 189201 ||  || — || September 14, 2003 || Palomar || NEAT || — || align=right | 7.5 km || 
|-id=202 bgcolor=#d6d6d6
| 189202 Calar Alto ||  ||  || September 17, 2003 || Heppenheim || F. Hormuth || — || align=right | 4.7 km || 
|-id=203 bgcolor=#d6d6d6
| 189203 ||  || — || September 16, 2003 || Palomar || NEAT || HYG || align=right | 6.0 km || 
|-id=204 bgcolor=#d6d6d6
| 189204 ||  || — || September 19, 2003 || Kitt Peak || Spacewatch || — || align=right | 6.4 km || 
|-id=205 bgcolor=#d6d6d6
| 189205 ||  || — || September 16, 2003 || Socorro || LINEAR || — || align=right | 3.0 km || 
|-id=206 bgcolor=#d6d6d6
| 189206 ||  || — || September 17, 2003 || Socorro || LINEAR || URS || align=right | 7.4 km || 
|-id=207 bgcolor=#d6d6d6
| 189207 ||  || — || September 21, 2003 || Anderson Mesa || LONEOS || EUP || align=right | 7.3 km || 
|-id=208 bgcolor=#d6d6d6
| 189208 ||  || — || September 25, 2003 || Palomar || NEAT || — || align=right | 4.4 km || 
|-id=209 bgcolor=#d6d6d6
| 189209 ||  || — || September 28, 2003 || Anderson Mesa || LONEOS || — || align=right | 7.5 km || 
|-id=210 bgcolor=#d6d6d6
| 189210 ||  || — || September 28, 2003 || Socorro || LINEAR || — || align=right | 5.9 km || 
|-id=211 bgcolor=#d6d6d6
| 189211 ||  || — || October 20, 2003 || Socorro || LINEAR || — || align=right | 4.4 km || 
|-id=212 bgcolor=#d6d6d6
| 189212 ||  || — || October 22, 2003 || Kingsnake || J. V. McClusky || — || align=right | 6.1 km || 
|-id=213 bgcolor=#d6d6d6
| 189213 ||  || — || October 19, 2003 || Socorro || LINEAR || THB || align=right | 5.7 km || 
|-id=214 bgcolor=#C2FFFF
| 189214 ||  || — || December 17, 2003 || Kitt Peak || Spacewatch || L5 || align=right | 13 km || 
|-id=215 bgcolor=#C2FFFF
| 189215 ||  || — || December 17, 2003 || Socorro || LINEAR || L5 || align=right | 15 km || 
|-id=216 bgcolor=#fefefe
| 189216 ||  || — || January 28, 2004 || Socorro || LINEAR || — || align=right | 2.9 km || 
|-id=217 bgcolor=#fefefe
| 189217 ||  || — || February 11, 2004 || Palomar || NEAT || NYS || align=right data-sort-value="0.72" | 720 m || 
|-id=218 bgcolor=#fefefe
| 189218 ||  || — || February 19, 2004 || Socorro || LINEAR || — || align=right | 1.4 km || 
|-id=219 bgcolor=#fefefe
| 189219 ||  || — || March 14, 2004 || Palomar || NEAT || — || align=right | 1.2 km || 
|-id=220 bgcolor=#fefefe
| 189220 ||  || — || March 14, 2004 || Kitt Peak || Spacewatch || — || align=right | 1.3 km || 
|-id=221 bgcolor=#fefefe
| 189221 ||  || — || March 14, 2004 || Kitt Peak || Spacewatch || — || align=right | 1.6 km || 
|-id=222 bgcolor=#fefefe
| 189222 ||  || — || March 16, 2004 || Campo Imperatore || CINEOS || — || align=right | 1.4 km || 
|-id=223 bgcolor=#fefefe
| 189223 ||  || — || March 20, 2004 || Socorro || LINEAR || FLO || align=right | 1.1 km || 
|-id=224 bgcolor=#fefefe
| 189224 ||  || — || April 12, 2004 || Anderson Mesa || LONEOS || NYS || align=right | 2.3 km || 
|-id=225 bgcolor=#fefefe
| 189225 ||  || — || April 15, 2004 || Palomar || NEAT || V || align=right data-sort-value="0.83" | 830 m || 
|-id=226 bgcolor=#fefefe
| 189226 ||  || — || April 15, 2004 || Kitt Peak || Spacewatch || — || align=right | 1.0 km || 
|-id=227 bgcolor=#fefefe
| 189227 ||  || — || April 16, 2004 || Kitt Peak || Spacewatch || — || align=right | 1.3 km || 
|-id=228 bgcolor=#fefefe
| 189228 ||  || — || May 15, 2004 || Socorro || LINEAR || MAS || align=right data-sort-value="0.95" | 950 m || 
|-id=229 bgcolor=#E9E9E9
| 189229 ||  || — || May 15, 2004 || Socorro || LINEAR || — || align=right | 1.4 km || 
|-id=230 bgcolor=#E9E9E9
| 189230 ||  || — || June 14, 2004 || Socorro || LINEAR || — || align=right | 2.6 km || 
|-id=231 bgcolor=#fefefe
| 189231 ||  || — || June 14, 2004 || Bergisch Gladbach || W. Bickel || — || align=right | 1.8 km || 
|-id=232 bgcolor=#E9E9E9
| 189232 ||  || — || June 17, 2004 || Siding Spring || SSS || — || align=right | 2.4 km || 
|-id=233 bgcolor=#E9E9E9
| 189233 ||  || — || July 10, 2004 || Catalina || CSS || — || align=right | 1.3 km || 
|-id=234 bgcolor=#E9E9E9
| 189234 ||  || — || July 11, 2004 || Socorro || LINEAR || — || align=right | 1.7 km || 
|-id=235 bgcolor=#E9E9E9
| 189235 ||  || — || July 16, 2004 || Socorro || LINEAR || — || align=right | 1.7 km || 
|-id=236 bgcolor=#E9E9E9
| 189236 ||  || — || July 27, 2004 || Socorro || LINEAR || — || align=right | 1.8 km || 
|-id=237 bgcolor=#E9E9E9
| 189237 ||  || — || August 8, 2004 || Anderson Mesa || LONEOS || — || align=right | 2.0 km || 
|-id=238 bgcolor=#E9E9E9
| 189238 ||  || — || August 11, 2004 || Socorro || LINEAR || — || align=right | 3.8 km || 
|-id=239 bgcolor=#E9E9E9
| 189239 ||  || — || August 21, 2004 || Siding Spring || SSS || — || align=right | 1.8 km || 
|-id=240 bgcolor=#d6d6d6
| 189240 ||  || — || August 26, 2004 || Socorro || LINEAR || ALA || align=right | 7.2 km || 
|-id=241 bgcolor=#d6d6d6
| 189241 ||  || — || September 8, 2004 || Socorro || LINEAR || — || align=right | 4.2 km || 
|-id=242 bgcolor=#d6d6d6
| 189242 ||  || — || September 8, 2004 || Socorro || LINEAR || — || align=right | 4.9 km || 
|-id=243 bgcolor=#E9E9E9
| 189243 ||  || — || September 10, 2004 || Socorro || LINEAR || — || align=right | 3.9 km || 
|-id=244 bgcolor=#d6d6d6
| 189244 ||  || — || September 10, 2004 || Socorro || LINEAR || — || align=right | 6.4 km || 
|-id=245 bgcolor=#E9E9E9
| 189245 ||  || — || September 10, 2004 || Socorro || LINEAR || — || align=right | 4.6 km || 
|-id=246 bgcolor=#E9E9E9
| 189246 ||  || — || September 10, 2004 || Socorro || LINEAR || — || align=right | 3.2 km || 
|-id=247 bgcolor=#E9E9E9
| 189247 ||  || — || September 11, 2004 || Socorro || LINEAR || EUN || align=right | 2.1 km || 
|-id=248 bgcolor=#E9E9E9
| 189248 ||  || — || September 8, 2004 || Socorro || LINEAR || ADE || align=right | 2.9 km || 
|-id=249 bgcolor=#E9E9E9
| 189249 ||  || — || September 12, 2004 || Palomar || NEAT || — || align=right | 5.8 km || 
|-id=250 bgcolor=#E9E9E9
| 189250 ||  || — || September 17, 2004 || Kitt Peak || Spacewatch || MRX || align=right | 1.7 km || 
|-id=251 bgcolor=#E9E9E9
| 189251 ||  || — || October 5, 2004 || Haleakala || NEAT || — || align=right | 4.4 km || 
|-id=252 bgcolor=#d6d6d6
| 189252 ||  || — || October 14, 2004 || Goodricke-Pigott || R. A. Tucker || — || align=right | 3.2 km || 
|-id=253 bgcolor=#E9E9E9
| 189253 ||  || — || October 5, 2004 || Palomar || NEAT || ADE || align=right | 4.4 km || 
|-id=254 bgcolor=#d6d6d6
| 189254 ||  || — || October 6, 2004 || Kitt Peak || Spacewatch || KOR || align=right | 1.6 km || 
|-id=255 bgcolor=#E9E9E9
| 189255 ||  || — || October 7, 2004 || Socorro || LINEAR || ADE || align=right | 4.5 km || 
|-id=256 bgcolor=#d6d6d6
| 189256 ||  || — || October 16, 2004 || Socorro || LINEAR || — || align=right | 6.8 km || 
|-id=257 bgcolor=#fefefe
| 189257 ||  || — || November 4, 2004 || Kitt Peak || Spacewatch || FLO || align=right | 1.0 km || 
|-id=258 bgcolor=#E9E9E9
| 189258 ||  || — || November 9, 2004 || Catalina || CSS || — || align=right | 4.4 km || 
|-id=259 bgcolor=#d6d6d6
| 189259 ||  || — || November 12, 2004 || Catalina || CSS || HYG || align=right | 4.1 km || 
|-id=260 bgcolor=#E9E9E9
| 189260 ||  || — || November 18, 2004 || Socorro || LINEAR || — || align=right | 5.9 km || 
|-id=261 bgcolor=#d6d6d6
| 189261 Hiroo ||  ||  || December 11, 2004 || Yamagata || K. Itagaki || — || align=right | 3.8 km || 
|-id=262 bgcolor=#d6d6d6
| 189262 ||  || — || December 10, 2004 || Socorro || LINEAR || ALA || align=right | 7.6 km || 
|-id=263 bgcolor=#FFC2E0
| 189263 || 2005 CA || — || February 1, 2005 || Socorro || LINEAR || AMO +1km || align=right | 2.5 km || 
|-id=264 bgcolor=#d6d6d6
| 189264 Gerardjeong ||  ||  || April 10, 2005 || Mount Lemmon || A. D. Grauer || EOS || align=right | 3.1 km || 
|-id=265 bgcolor=#fefefe
| 189265 ||  || — || April 9, 2005 || Siding Spring || SSS || H || align=right | 1.1 km || 
|-id=266 bgcolor=#fefefe
| 189266 ||  || — || August 25, 2005 || Palomar || NEAT || — || align=right data-sort-value="0.99" | 990 m || 
|-id=267 bgcolor=#E9E9E9
| 189267 ||  || — || August 27, 2005 || Kitt Peak || Spacewatch || — || align=right | 2.2 km || 
|-id=268 bgcolor=#fefefe
| 189268 ||  || — || August 31, 2005 || Kitt Peak || Spacewatch || V || align=right data-sort-value="0.96" | 960 m || 
|-id=269 bgcolor=#fefefe
| 189269 ||  || — || August 28, 2005 || Kitt Peak || Spacewatch || V || align=right data-sort-value="0.91" | 910 m || 
|-id=270 bgcolor=#fefefe
| 189270 ||  || — || August 31, 2005 || Kitt Peak || Spacewatch || — || align=right | 1.3 km || 
|-id=271 bgcolor=#fefefe
| 189271 ||  || — || September 6, 2005 || Anderson Mesa || LONEOS || NYS || align=right | 2.7 km || 
|-id=272 bgcolor=#fefefe
| 189272 ||  || — || September 11, 2005 || Anderson Mesa || LONEOS || FLO || align=right | 1.3 km || 
|-id=273 bgcolor=#E9E9E9
| 189273 ||  || — || September 9, 2005 || Socorro || LINEAR || — || align=right | 2.6 km || 
|-id=274 bgcolor=#E9E9E9
| 189274 ||  || — || September 12, 2005 || Anderson Mesa || LONEOS || — || align=right | 2.0 km || 
|-id=275 bgcolor=#fefefe
| 189275 ||  || — || September 23, 2005 || Catalina || CSS || — || align=right | 1.1 km || 
|-id=276 bgcolor=#E9E9E9
| 189276 ||  || — || September 24, 2005 || Kitt Peak || Spacewatch || — || align=right | 2.4 km || 
|-id=277 bgcolor=#fefefe
| 189277 ||  || — || September 29, 2005 || Kitt Peak || Spacewatch || V || align=right | 1.0 km || 
|-id=278 bgcolor=#E9E9E9
| 189278 ||  || — || September 25, 2005 || Kitt Peak || Spacewatch || — || align=right | 1.8 km || 
|-id=279 bgcolor=#fefefe
| 189279 ||  || — || September 29, 2005 || Anderson Mesa || LONEOS || V || align=right data-sort-value="0.87" | 870 m || 
|-id=280 bgcolor=#fefefe
| 189280 ||  || — || September 29, 2005 || Palomar || NEAT || — || align=right | 1.0 km || 
|-id=281 bgcolor=#fefefe
| 189281 ||  || — || September 23, 2005 || Palomar || NEAT || V || align=right | 1.1 km || 
|-id=282 bgcolor=#fefefe
| 189282 ||  || — || October 1, 2005 || Kitt Peak || Spacewatch || V || align=right | 1.1 km || 
|-id=283 bgcolor=#FA8072
| 189283 ||  || — || October 3, 2005 || Palomar || NEAT || — || align=right | 1.9 km || 
|-id=284 bgcolor=#fefefe
| 189284 ||  || — || October 2, 2005 || Anderson Mesa || LONEOS || — || align=right data-sort-value="0.99" | 990 m || 
|-id=285 bgcolor=#fefefe
| 189285 ||  || — || October 1, 2005 || Catalina || CSS || — || align=right | 1.4 km || 
|-id=286 bgcolor=#fefefe
| 189286 ||  || — || October 3, 2005 || Kitt Peak || Spacewatch || — || align=right data-sort-value="0.94" | 940 m || 
|-id=287 bgcolor=#fefefe
| 189287 ||  || — || October 13, 2005 || Socorro || LINEAR || FLO || align=right | 1.1 km || 
|-id=288 bgcolor=#E9E9E9
| 189288 ||  || — || October 1, 2005 || Kitt Peak || Spacewatch || XIZ || align=right | 2.4 km || 
|-id=289 bgcolor=#E9E9E9
| 189289 ||  || — || October 22, 2005 || Kitt Peak || Spacewatch || HOF || align=right | 4.2 km || 
|-id=290 bgcolor=#d6d6d6
| 189290 ||  || — || October 21, 2005 || Palomar || NEAT || TIR || align=right | 4.1 km || 
|-id=291 bgcolor=#fefefe
| 189291 ||  || — || October 23, 2005 || Palomar || NEAT || V || align=right data-sort-value="0.85" | 850 m || 
|-id=292 bgcolor=#fefefe
| 189292 ||  || — || October 22, 2005 || Kitt Peak || Spacewatch || NYS || align=right data-sort-value="0.88" | 880 m || 
|-id=293 bgcolor=#fefefe
| 189293 ||  || — || October 24, 2005 || Kitt Peak || Spacewatch || NYS || align=right data-sort-value="0.87" | 870 m || 
|-id=294 bgcolor=#d6d6d6
| 189294 ||  || — || October 24, 2005 || Kitt Peak || Spacewatch || KOR || align=right | 1.7 km || 
|-id=295 bgcolor=#d6d6d6
| 189295 ||  || — || October 25, 2005 || Kitt Peak || Spacewatch || KOR || align=right | 1.8 km || 
|-id=296 bgcolor=#fefefe
| 189296 ||  || — || October 30, 2005 || Palomar || NEAT || — || align=right | 1.5 km || 
|-id=297 bgcolor=#E9E9E9
| 189297 ||  || — || October 31, 2005 || Mount Lemmon || Mount Lemmon Survey || WIT || align=right | 1.5 km || 
|-id=298 bgcolor=#fefefe
| 189298 ||  || — || November 8, 2005 || Catalina || CSS || — || align=right | 1.4 km || 
|-id=299 bgcolor=#fefefe
| 189299 ||  || — || November 10, 2005 || Mount Lemmon || Mount Lemmon Survey || — || align=right | 1.3 km || 
|-id=300 bgcolor=#fefefe
| 189300 ||  || — || November 5, 2005 || Catalina || CSS || — || align=right | 3.2 km || 
|}

189301–189400 

|-bgcolor=#E9E9E9
| 189301 ||  || — || November 21, 2005 || Catalina || CSS || AGN || align=right | 1.8 km || 
|-id=302 bgcolor=#fefefe
| 189302 ||  || — || November 28, 2005 || Socorro || LINEAR || — || align=right | 1.5 km || 
|-id=303 bgcolor=#d6d6d6
| 189303 ||  || — || November 28, 2005 || Socorro || LINEAR || — || align=right | 4.3 km || 
|-id=304 bgcolor=#E9E9E9
| 189304 ||  || — || November 29, 2005 || Mount Lemmon || Mount Lemmon Survey || MAR || align=right | 2.3 km || 
|-id=305 bgcolor=#E9E9E9
| 189305 ||  || — || November 21, 2005 || Anderson Mesa || LONEOS || GER || align=right | 3.9 km || 
|-id=306 bgcolor=#d6d6d6
| 189306 ||  || — || December 6, 2005 || Catalina || CSS || — || align=right | 6.3 km || 
|-id=307 bgcolor=#E9E9E9
| 189307 ||  || — || December 25, 2005 || Mount Lemmon || Mount Lemmon Survey || AGN || align=right | 1.9 km || 
|-id=308 bgcolor=#E9E9E9
| 189308 ||  || — || December 27, 2005 || Kitt Peak || Spacewatch || — || align=right | 1.8 km || 
|-id=309 bgcolor=#fefefe
| 189309 ||  || — || December 29, 2005 || Socorro || LINEAR || — || align=right | 1.9 km || 
|-id=310 bgcolor=#C2FFFF
| 189310 Polydamas ||  ||  || January 3, 2006 || Mérida || I. R. Ferrín || L5 || align=right | 14 km || 
|-id=311 bgcolor=#d6d6d6
| 189311 ||  || — || January 26, 2006 || Kitt Peak || Spacewatch || — || align=right | 2.7 km || 
|-id=312 bgcolor=#d6d6d6
| 189312 Jameyszalay ||  ||  || May 1, 2006 || Kitt Peak || M. W. Buie || — || align=right | 4.5 km || 
|-id=313 bgcolor=#fefefe
| 189313 ||  || — || September 19, 2006 || Kitt Peak || Spacewatch || V || align=right data-sort-value="0.75" | 750 m || 
|-id=314 bgcolor=#fefefe
| 189314 ||  || — || October 11, 2006 || Kitt Peak || Spacewatch || — || align=right data-sort-value="0.97" | 970 m || 
|-id=315 bgcolor=#d6d6d6
| 189315 ||  || — || October 17, 2006 || Mount Lemmon || Mount Lemmon Survey || — || align=right | 2.6 km || 
|-id=316 bgcolor=#fefefe
| 189316 ||  || — || October 21, 2006 || Mount Lemmon || Mount Lemmon Survey || NYS || align=right | 1.1 km || 
|-id=317 bgcolor=#E9E9E9
| 189317 ||  || — || November 18, 2006 || Mount Lemmon || Mount Lemmon Survey || — || align=right | 1.3 km || 
|-id=318 bgcolor=#d6d6d6
| 189318 ||  || — || November 22, 2006 || Mount Lemmon || Mount Lemmon Survey || — || align=right | 5.3 km || 
|-id=319 bgcolor=#fefefe
| 189319 ||  || — || December 13, 2006 || Kitt Peak || Spacewatch || ERI || align=right | 2.9 km || 
|-id=320 bgcolor=#fefefe
| 189320 ||  || — || December 22, 2006 || Piszkéstető || K. Sárneczky || FLO || align=right | 1.0 km || 
|-id=321 bgcolor=#d6d6d6
| 189321 ||  || — || December 24, 2006 || Catalina || CSS || EUP || align=right | 6.1 km || 
|-id=322 bgcolor=#E9E9E9
| 189322 ||  || — || January 8, 2007 || Mount Lemmon || Mount Lemmon Survey || — || align=right | 2.2 km || 
|-id=323 bgcolor=#fefefe
| 189323 ||  || — || January 9, 2007 || Mount Lemmon || Mount Lemmon Survey || — || align=right | 1.3 km || 
|-id=324 bgcolor=#E9E9E9
| 189324 ||  || — || January 9, 2007 || Kitt Peak || Spacewatch || — || align=right | 2.9 km || 
|-id=325 bgcolor=#d6d6d6
| 189325 ||  || — || January 10, 2007 || Kitt Peak || Spacewatch || — || align=right | 3.1 km || 
|-id=326 bgcolor=#d6d6d6
| 189326 ||  || — || January 16, 2007 || Catalina || CSS || — || align=right | 3.9 km || 
|-id=327 bgcolor=#fefefe
| 189327 ||  || — || January 27, 2007 || Mount Lemmon || Mount Lemmon Survey || — || align=right | 1.2 km || 
|-id=328 bgcolor=#E9E9E9
| 189328 ||  || — || February 15, 2007 || Palomar || NEAT || — || align=right | 3.4 km || 
|-id=329 bgcolor=#fefefe
| 189329 ||  || — || February 21, 2007 || Socorro || LINEAR || FLO || align=right | 1.1 km || 
|-id=330 bgcolor=#d6d6d6
| 189330 ||  || — || February 21, 2007 || Mount Lemmon || Mount Lemmon Survey || EOS || align=right | 3.1 km || 
|-id=331 bgcolor=#fefefe
| 189331 ||  || — || February 22, 2007 || Socorro || LINEAR || — || align=right | 1.2 km || 
|-id=332 bgcolor=#E9E9E9
| 189332 ||  || — || March 10, 2007 || Mount Lemmon || Mount Lemmon Survey || — || align=right | 1.8 km || 
|-id=333 bgcolor=#d6d6d6
| 189333 ||  || — || March 10, 2007 || Kitt Peak || Spacewatch || EMA || align=right | 6.2 km || 
|-id=334 bgcolor=#E9E9E9
| 189334 ||  || — || April 15, 2007 || Kitt Peak || Spacewatch || — || align=right | 1.9 km || 
|-id=335 bgcolor=#d6d6d6
| 189335 ||  || — || April 22, 2007 || Catalina || CSS || — || align=right | 5.0 km || 
|-id=336 bgcolor=#E9E9E9
| 189336 ||  || — || October 9, 2007 || Kitt Peak || Spacewatch || — || align=right | 2.2 km || 
|-id=337 bgcolor=#d6d6d6
| 189337 ||  || — || October 9, 2007 || Mount Lemmon || Mount Lemmon Survey || — || align=right | 4.1 km || 
|-id=338 bgcolor=#E9E9E9
| 189338 ||  || — || November 2, 2007 || Mount Lemmon || Mount Lemmon Survey || — || align=right | 1.9 km || 
|-id=339 bgcolor=#E9E9E9
| 189339 ||  || — || November 2, 2007 || Socorro || LINEAR || — || align=right | 2.3 km || 
|-id=340 bgcolor=#fefefe
| 189340 ||  || — || November 13, 2007 || Kitt Peak || Spacewatch || FLO || align=right data-sort-value="0.89" | 890 m || 
|-id=341 bgcolor=#d6d6d6
| 189341 ||  || — || November 12, 2007 || Catalina || CSS || — || align=right | 3.9 km || 
|-id=342 bgcolor=#fefefe
| 189342 ||  || — || November 8, 2007 || Mount Lemmon || Mount Lemmon Survey || — || align=right | 1.2 km || 
|-id=343 bgcolor=#fefefe
| 189343 ||  || — || November 18, 2007 || Kitt Peak || Spacewatch || NYS || align=right data-sort-value="0.83" | 830 m || 
|-id=344 bgcolor=#E9E9E9
| 189344 ||  || — || December 14, 2007 || Mount Lemmon || Mount Lemmon Survey || — || align=right | 3.7 km || 
|-id=345 bgcolor=#fefefe
| 189345 ||  || — || December 31, 2007 || Mount Lemmon || Mount Lemmon Survey || — || align=right | 1.1 km || 
|-id=346 bgcolor=#fefefe
| 189346 ||  || — || January 10, 2008 || Kitt Peak || Spacewatch || NYS || align=right data-sort-value="0.99" | 990 m || 
|-id=347 bgcolor=#d6d6d6
| 189347 Qian ||  ||  || January 28, 2008 || Lulin Observatory || Q.-z. Ye || EOS || align=right | 3.0 km || 
|-id=348 bgcolor=#fefefe
| 189348 ||  || — || January 30, 2008 || Catalina || CSS || — || align=right | 1.0 km || 
|-id=349 bgcolor=#E9E9E9
| 189349 ||  || — || February 2, 2008 || Kitt Peak || Spacewatch || — || align=right | 2.3 km || 
|-id=350 bgcolor=#E9E9E9
| 189350 ||  || — || February 10, 2008 || Mount Lemmon || Mount Lemmon Survey || — || align=right | 2.8 km || 
|-id=351 bgcolor=#E9E9E9
| 189351 ||  || — || February 13, 2008 || Mount Lemmon || Mount Lemmon Survey || — || align=right | 2.0 km || 
|-id=352 bgcolor=#d6d6d6
| 189352 ||  || — || February 7, 2008 || Mount Lemmon || Mount Lemmon Survey || EOS || align=right | 2.4 km || 
|-id=353 bgcolor=#d6d6d6
| 189353 ||  || — || February 11, 2008 || Mount Lemmon || Mount Lemmon Survey || — || align=right | 3.4 km || 
|-id=354 bgcolor=#E9E9E9
| 189354 ||  || — || February 26, 2008 || Kitt Peak || Spacewatch || — || align=right | 1.5 km || 
|-id=355 bgcolor=#d6d6d6
| 189355 ||  || — || February 26, 2008 || Mount Lemmon || Mount Lemmon Survey || EMA || align=right | 5.3 km || 
|-id=356 bgcolor=#fefefe
| 189356 ||  || — || February 27, 2008 || Catalina || CSS || — || align=right | 1.2 km || 
|-id=357 bgcolor=#fefefe
| 189357 ||  || — || February 27, 2008 || Kitt Peak || Spacewatch || FLO || align=right | 1.2 km || 
|-id=358 bgcolor=#d6d6d6
| 189358 ||  || — || February 27, 2008 || Mount Lemmon || Mount Lemmon Survey || — || align=right | 2.8 km || 
|-id=359 bgcolor=#E9E9E9
| 189359 ||  || — || February 27, 2008 || Mount Lemmon || Mount Lemmon Survey || AGN || align=right | 1.4 km || 
|-id=360 bgcolor=#E9E9E9
| 189360 ||  || — || February 27, 2008 || Mount Lemmon || Mount Lemmon Survey || — || align=right | 3.1 km || 
|-id=361 bgcolor=#fefefe
| 189361 ||  || — || February 27, 2008 || Mount Lemmon || Mount Lemmon Survey || — || align=right | 1.1 km || 
|-id=362 bgcolor=#d6d6d6
| 189362 ||  || — || February 28, 2008 || Mount Lemmon || Mount Lemmon Survey || HYG || align=right | 5.2 km || 
|-id=363 bgcolor=#d6d6d6
| 189363 ||  || — || March 3, 2008 || Kitt Peak || Spacewatch || EOS || align=right | 2.4 km || 
|-id=364 bgcolor=#E9E9E9
| 189364 ||  || — || March 8, 2008 || Kitt Peak || Spacewatch || — || align=right | 1.8 km || 
|-id=365 bgcolor=#d6d6d6
| 189365 ||  || — || March 1, 2008 || Kitt Peak || Spacewatch || — || align=right | 2.9 km || 
|-id=366 bgcolor=#E9E9E9
| 189366 ||  || — || March 1, 2008 || Kitt Peak || Spacewatch || MIS || align=right | 3.4 km || 
|-id=367 bgcolor=#d6d6d6
| 189367 ||  || — || March 4, 2008 || Kitt Peak || Spacewatch || — || align=right | 3.3 km || 
|-id=368 bgcolor=#E9E9E9
| 189368 ||  || — || March 5, 2008 || Kitt Peak || Spacewatch || — || align=right | 1.7 km || 
|-id=369 bgcolor=#d6d6d6
| 189369 ||  || — || March 10, 2008 || Siding Spring || SSS || — || align=right | 5.5 km || 
|-id=370 bgcolor=#fefefe
| 189370 ||  || — || March 13, 2008 || Catalina || CSS || — || align=right | 1.3 km || 
|-id=371 bgcolor=#d6d6d6
| 189371 ||  || — || March 11, 2008 || Kitt Peak || Spacewatch || — || align=right | 4.0 km || 
|-id=372 bgcolor=#d6d6d6
| 189372 ||  || — || March 13, 2008 || Catalina || CSS || EOS || align=right | 3.2 km || 
|-id=373 bgcolor=#E9E9E9
| 189373 ||  || — || March 27, 2008 || Mount Lemmon || Mount Lemmon Survey || AGN || align=right | 1.6 km || 
|-id=374 bgcolor=#E9E9E9
| 189374 ||  || — || March 28, 2008 || Mount Lemmon || Mount Lemmon Survey || MIS || align=right | 3.2 km || 
|-id=375 bgcolor=#d6d6d6
| 189375 ||  || — || March 28, 2008 || Kitt Peak || Spacewatch || 7:4 || align=right | 4.3 km || 
|-id=376 bgcolor=#d6d6d6
| 189376 ||  || — || March 27, 2008 || Mount Lemmon || Mount Lemmon Survey || KOR || align=right | 1.9 km || 
|-id=377 bgcolor=#C2FFFF
| 189377 ||  || — || March 27, 2008 || Mount Lemmon || Mount Lemmon Survey || L5 || align=right | 13 km || 
|-id=378 bgcolor=#E9E9E9
| 189378 ||  || — || March 30, 2008 || Kitt Peak || Spacewatch || WIT || align=right | 1.7 km || 
|-id=379 bgcolor=#E9E9E9
| 189379 ||  || — || March 30, 2008 || Kitt Peak || Spacewatch || MRX || align=right | 1.6 km || 
|-id=380 bgcolor=#fefefe
| 189380 ||  || — || March 28, 2008 || Mount Lemmon || Mount Lemmon Survey || NYS || align=right data-sort-value="0.88" | 880 m || 
|-id=381 bgcolor=#fefefe
| 189381 ||  || — || March 28, 2008 || Mount Lemmon || Mount Lemmon Survey || — || align=right | 1.2 km || 
|-id=382 bgcolor=#d6d6d6
| 189382 ||  || — || April 1, 2008 || Mount Lemmon || Mount Lemmon Survey || TIR || align=right | 3.1 km || 
|-id=383 bgcolor=#E9E9E9
| 189383 ||  || — || April 3, 2008 || Kitt Peak || Spacewatch || — || align=right | 1.8 km || 
|-id=384 bgcolor=#E9E9E9
| 189384 ||  || — || April 3, 2008 || Mount Lemmon || Mount Lemmon Survey || MIS || align=right | 3.6 km || 
|-id=385 bgcolor=#E9E9E9
| 189385 ||  || — || April 3, 2008 || Kitt Peak || Spacewatch || WIT || align=right | 1.3 km || 
|-id=386 bgcolor=#C2FFFF
| 189386 ||  || — || April 5, 2008 || Kitt Peak || Spacewatch || L5 || align=right | 14 km || 
|-id=387 bgcolor=#E9E9E9
| 189387 ||  || — || April 8, 2008 || Kitt Peak || Spacewatch || HOF || align=right | 4.1 km || 
|-id=388 bgcolor=#E9E9E9
| 189388 ||  || — || April 8, 2008 || Kitt Peak || Spacewatch || — || align=right | 2.5 km || 
|-id=389 bgcolor=#E9E9E9
| 189389 ||  || — || April 13, 2008 || Mount Lemmon || Mount Lemmon Survey || EUN || align=right | 1.9 km || 
|-id=390 bgcolor=#E9E9E9
| 189390 ||  || — || April 14, 2008 || Mount Lemmon || Mount Lemmon Survey || — || align=right | 2.0 km || 
|-id=391 bgcolor=#d6d6d6
| 189391 ||  || — || April 24, 2008 || Kitt Peak || Spacewatch || HYG || align=right | 3.8 km || 
|-id=392 bgcolor=#E9E9E9
| 189392 ||  || — || April 26, 2008 || Mount Lemmon || Mount Lemmon Survey || PAD || align=right | 3.5 km || 
|-id=393 bgcolor=#fefefe
| 189393 ||  || — || April 26, 2008 || Mount Lemmon || Mount Lemmon Survey || — || align=right data-sort-value="0.98" | 980 m || 
|-id=394 bgcolor=#fefefe
| 189394 ||  || — || April 28, 2008 || Kitt Peak || Spacewatch || — || align=right data-sort-value="0.81" | 810 m || 
|-id=395 bgcolor=#d6d6d6
| 189395 ||  || — || April 30, 2008 || Kitt Peak || Spacewatch || — || align=right | 4.2 km || 
|-id=396 bgcolor=#E9E9E9
| 189396 Sielewicz ||  ||  || May 2, 2008 || Moletai || K. Černis, J. Zdanavičius || — || align=right | 3.2 km || 
|-id=397 bgcolor=#fefefe
| 189397 ||  || — || May 4, 2008 || Kitt Peak || Spacewatch || — || align=right | 1.3 km || 
|-id=398 bgcolor=#E9E9E9
| 189398 Soemmerring ||  ||  || May 7, 2008 || Taunus || S. Karge, R. Kling || — || align=right | 1.4 km || 
|-id=399 bgcolor=#E9E9E9
| 189399 ||  || — || May 5, 2008 || Mount Lemmon || Mount Lemmon Survey || — || align=right | 3.5 km || 
|-id=400 bgcolor=#d6d6d6
| 189400 ||  || — || May 7, 2008 || Siding Spring || SSS || — || align=right | 5.3 km || 
|}

189401–189500 

|-bgcolor=#d6d6d6
| 189401 ||  || — || May 27, 2008 || Kitt Peak || Spacewatch || EOS || align=right | 2.7 km || 
|-id=402 bgcolor=#d6d6d6
| 189402 ||  || — || May 26, 2008 || Kitt Peak || Spacewatch || BRA || align=right | 1.8 km || 
|-id=403 bgcolor=#d6d6d6
| 189403 ||  || — || May 27, 2008 || Kitt Peak || Spacewatch || — || align=right | 4.8 km || 
|-id=404 bgcolor=#E9E9E9
| 189404 ||  || — || May 29, 2008 || Kitt Peak || Spacewatch || GEF || align=right | 1.8 km || 
|-id=405 bgcolor=#d6d6d6
| 189405 ||  || — || May 27, 2008 || Kitt Peak || Spacewatch || — || align=right | 4.7 km || 
|-id=406 bgcolor=#d6d6d6
| 189406 || 4835 P-L || — || September 24, 1960 || Palomar || PLS || — || align=right | 3.9 km || 
|-id=407 bgcolor=#E9E9E9
| 189407 || 3283 T-2 || — || September 30, 1973 || Palomar || PLS || GEF || align=right | 3.6 km || 
|-id=408 bgcolor=#d6d6d6
| 189408 ||  || — || February 4, 1989 || La Silla || E. W. Elst || LIX || align=right | 6.8 km || 
|-id=409 bgcolor=#d6d6d6
| 189409 ||  || — || September 27, 1992 || Kitt Peak || Spacewatch || THM || align=right | 2.8 km || 
|-id=410 bgcolor=#E9E9E9
| 189410 ||  || — || March 17, 1993 || La Silla || UESAC || — || align=right | 2.8 km || 
|-id=411 bgcolor=#fefefe
| 189411 ||  || — || October 9, 1993 || La Silla || E. W. Elst || NYS || align=right data-sort-value="0.97" | 970 m || 
|-id=412 bgcolor=#fefefe
| 189412 ||  || — || October 10, 1993 || La Silla || H. Debehogne, E. W. Elst || NYS || align=right | 1.0 km || 
|-id=413 bgcolor=#fefefe
| 189413 ||  || — || August 10, 1994 || La Silla || E. W. Elst || — || align=right | 1.0 km || 
|-id=414 bgcolor=#fefefe
| 189414 ||  || — || October 28, 1994 || Kitt Peak || Spacewatch || — || align=right | 1.4 km || 
|-id=415 bgcolor=#fefefe
| 189415 ||  || — || October 18, 1995 || Kitt Peak || Spacewatch || — || align=right data-sort-value="0.94" | 940 m || 
|-id=416 bgcolor=#E9E9E9
| 189416 ||  || — || November 17, 1995 || Kitt Peak || Spacewatch || — || align=right | 3.2 km || 
|-id=417 bgcolor=#E9E9E9
| 189417 ||  || — || January 21, 1996 || Kitt Peak || Spacewatch || — || align=right | 3.5 km || 
|-id=418 bgcolor=#d6d6d6
| 189418 ||  || — || March 11, 1996 || Kitt Peak || Spacewatch || — || align=right | 3.6 km || 
|-id=419 bgcolor=#fefefe
| 189419 ||  || — || March 12, 1996 || Kitt Peak || Spacewatch || MAS || align=right | 1.1 km || 
|-id=420 bgcolor=#fefefe
| 189420 ||  || — || April 13, 1996 || Kitt Peak || Spacewatch || MAS || align=right | 1.0 km || 
|-id=421 bgcolor=#fefefe
| 189421 ||  || — || June 8, 1997 || Kitt Peak || Spacewatch || — || align=right | 1.2 km || 
|-id=422 bgcolor=#d6d6d6
| 189422 ||  || — || July 29, 1997 || Mallorca || Á. López J., R. Pacheco || — || align=right | 7.4 km || 
|-id=423 bgcolor=#d6d6d6
| 189423 ||  || — || August 7, 1997 || Lake Clear || K. A. Williams || ALA || align=right | 6.7 km || 
|-id=424 bgcolor=#fefefe
| 189424 ||  || — || September 25, 1997 || Kleť || Kleť Obs. || — || align=right | 1.4 km || 
|-id=425 bgcolor=#fefefe
| 189425 ||  || — || September 27, 1997 || Kitt Peak || Spacewatch || — || align=right | 1.5 km || 
|-id=426 bgcolor=#d6d6d6
| 189426 ||  || — || September 30, 1997 || Kitt Peak || Spacewatch || VER || align=right | 6.0 km || 
|-id=427 bgcolor=#fefefe
| 189427 ||  || — || October 1, 1997 || Caussols || ODAS || — || align=right | 1.4 km || 
|-id=428 bgcolor=#fefefe
| 189428 ||  || — || April 19, 1998 || Kitt Peak || Spacewatch || — || align=right data-sort-value="0.72" | 720 m || 
|-id=429 bgcolor=#E9E9E9
| 189429 ||  || — || April 23, 1998 || Socorro || LINEAR || — || align=right | 4.9 km || 
|-id=430 bgcolor=#FA8072
| 189430 ||  || — || April 21, 1998 || Socorro || LINEAR || — || align=right | 1.1 km || 
|-id=431 bgcolor=#fefefe
| 189431 ||  || — || July 29, 1998 || Caussols || ODAS || — || align=right | 1.2 km || 
|-id=432 bgcolor=#fefefe
| 189432 ||  || — || August 22, 1998 || Xinglong || SCAP || FLO || align=right data-sort-value="0.73" | 730 m || 
|-id=433 bgcolor=#fefefe
| 189433 ||  || — || August 17, 1998 || Socorro || LINEAR || FLO || align=right | 1.1 km || 
|-id=434 bgcolor=#d6d6d6
| 189434 ||  || — || August 24, 1998 || Socorro || LINEAR || — || align=right | 6.9 km || 
|-id=435 bgcolor=#fefefe
| 189435 ||  || — || August 26, 1998 || La Silla || E. W. Elst || — || align=right | 5.2 km || 
|-id=436 bgcolor=#fefefe
| 189436 ||  || — || September 14, 1998 || Socorro || LINEAR || FLO || align=right | 1.0 km || 
|-id=437 bgcolor=#fefefe
| 189437 ||  || — || September 14, 1998 || Socorro || LINEAR || FLO || align=right data-sort-value="0.94" | 940 m || 
|-id=438 bgcolor=#fefefe
| 189438 ||  || — || September 14, 1998 || Socorro || LINEAR || NYS || align=right | 2.5 km || 
|-id=439 bgcolor=#fefefe
| 189439 ||  || — || September 26, 1998 || Socorro || LINEAR || — || align=right | 1.3 km || 
|-id=440 bgcolor=#d6d6d6
| 189440 ||  || — || September 20, 1998 || Xinglong || SCAP || — || align=right | 2.9 km || 
|-id=441 bgcolor=#d6d6d6
| 189441 ||  || — || September 26, 1998 || Socorro || LINEAR || — || align=right | 4.7 km || 
|-id=442 bgcolor=#d6d6d6
| 189442 ||  || — || September 26, 1998 || Socorro || LINEAR || — || align=right | 3.4 km || 
|-id=443 bgcolor=#fefefe
| 189443 ||  || — || September 26, 1998 || Socorro || LINEAR || V || align=right | 1.2 km || 
|-id=444 bgcolor=#fefefe
| 189444 ||  || — || September 26, 1998 || Socorro || LINEAR || — || align=right | 1.1 km || 
|-id=445 bgcolor=#d6d6d6
| 189445 ||  || — || October 15, 1998 || Catalina || CSS || — || align=right | 7.4 km || 
|-id=446 bgcolor=#fefefe
| 189446 ||  || — || November 10, 1998 || Socorro || LINEAR || — || align=right | 1.6 km || 
|-id=447 bgcolor=#fefefe
| 189447 ||  || — || November 23, 1998 || Socorro || LINEAR || PHO || align=right | 3.2 km || 
|-id=448 bgcolor=#d6d6d6
| 189448 ||  || — || November 18, 1998 || Kitt Peak || Spacewatch || — || align=right | 5.0 km || 
|-id=449 bgcolor=#d6d6d6
| 189449 ||  || — || December 14, 1998 || Socorro || LINEAR || — || align=right | 4.3 km || 
|-id=450 bgcolor=#fefefe
| 189450 ||  || — || January 18, 1999 || Kitt Peak || Spacewatch || ERI || align=right | 2.7 km || 
|-id=451 bgcolor=#fefefe
| 189451 || 1999 ED || — || March 9, 1999 || Prescott || P. G. Comba || H || align=right data-sort-value="0.74" | 740 m || 
|-id=452 bgcolor=#E9E9E9
| 189452 ||  || — || March 12, 1999 || Kitt Peak || Spacewatch || — || align=right | 2.3 km || 
|-id=453 bgcolor=#E9E9E9
| 189453 ||  || — || March 19, 1999 || Kitt Peak || Spacewatch || — || align=right | 1.4 km || 
|-id=454 bgcolor=#E9E9E9
| 189454 ||  || — || May 12, 1999 || Socorro || LINEAR || JUN || align=right | 1.9 km || 
|-id=455 bgcolor=#E9E9E9
| 189455 ||  || — || July 12, 1999 || Socorro || LINEAR || — || align=right | 3.9 km || 
|-id=456 bgcolor=#E9E9E9
| 189456 ||  || — || September 4, 1999 || Catalina || CSS || — || align=right | 5.2 km || 
|-id=457 bgcolor=#E9E9E9
| 189457 ||  || — || September 8, 1999 || Socorro || LINEAR || — || align=right | 3.5 km || 
|-id=458 bgcolor=#E9E9E9
| 189458 ||  || — || September 4, 1999 || Ondřejov || L. Kotková || MRX || align=right | 1.7 km || 
|-id=459 bgcolor=#E9E9E9
| 189459 ||  || — || September 7, 1999 || Socorro || LINEAR || — || align=right | 2.7 km || 
|-id=460 bgcolor=#E9E9E9
| 189460 ||  || — || September 7, 1999 || Socorro || LINEAR || — || align=right | 3.9 km || 
|-id=461 bgcolor=#E9E9E9
| 189461 ||  || — || September 9, 1999 || Socorro || LINEAR || — || align=right | 3.7 km || 
|-id=462 bgcolor=#E9E9E9
| 189462 ||  || — || September 9, 1999 || Socorro || LINEAR || PAE || align=right | 4.0 km || 
|-id=463 bgcolor=#E9E9E9
| 189463 ||  || — || September 9, 1999 || Socorro || LINEAR || — || align=right | 4.0 km || 
|-id=464 bgcolor=#E9E9E9
| 189464 ||  || — || September 9, 1999 || Socorro || LINEAR || — || align=right | 4.1 km || 
|-id=465 bgcolor=#E9E9E9
| 189465 ||  || — || September 8, 1999 || Socorro || LINEAR || — || align=right | 4.6 km || 
|-id=466 bgcolor=#E9E9E9
| 189466 ||  || — || September 8, 1999 || Socorro || LINEAR || GEF || align=right | 2.9 km || 
|-id=467 bgcolor=#E9E9E9
| 189467 ||  || — || September 4, 1999 || Catalina || CSS || — || align=right | 4.5 km || 
|-id=468 bgcolor=#E9E9E9
| 189468 ||  || — || September 7, 1999 || Catalina || CSS || GEF || align=right | 2.1 km || 
|-id=469 bgcolor=#E9E9E9
| 189469 ||  || — || September 29, 1999 || Socorro || LINEAR || — || align=right | 4.3 km || 
|-id=470 bgcolor=#E9E9E9
| 189470 ||  || — || October 7, 1999 || Črni Vrh || Črni Vrh || — || align=right | 4.0 km || 
|-id=471 bgcolor=#fefefe
| 189471 ||  || — || October 10, 1999 || Kitt Peak || Spacewatch || — || align=right data-sort-value="0.91" | 910 m || 
|-id=472 bgcolor=#E9E9E9
| 189472 ||  || — || October 9, 1999 || Socorro || LINEAR || — || align=right | 3.1 km || 
|-id=473 bgcolor=#E9E9E9
| 189473 ||  || — || October 1, 1999 || Catalina || CSS || GEF || align=right | 1.8 km || 
|-id=474 bgcolor=#E9E9E9
| 189474 ||  || — || October 1, 1999 || Catalina || CSS || — || align=right | 4.1 km || 
|-id=475 bgcolor=#E9E9E9
| 189475 ||  || — || October 9, 1999 || Catalina || CSS || — || align=right | 4.4 km || 
|-id=476 bgcolor=#E9E9E9
| 189476 ||  || — || October 9, 1999 || Socorro || LINEAR || MRX || align=right | 1.8 km || 
|-id=477 bgcolor=#d6d6d6
| 189477 ||  || — || October 8, 1999 || Kitt Peak || Spacewatch || KAR || align=right | 1.4 km || 
|-id=478 bgcolor=#E9E9E9
| 189478 ||  || — || October 29, 1999 || Catalina || CSS || GEF || align=right | 2.3 km || 
|-id=479 bgcolor=#E9E9E9
| 189479 ||  || — || October 31, 1999 || Socorro || LINEAR || — || align=right | 6.6 km || 
|-id=480 bgcolor=#E9E9E9
| 189480 ||  || — || October 28, 1999 || Catalina || CSS || GEF || align=right | 2.3 km || 
|-id=481 bgcolor=#E9E9E9
| 189481 ||  || — || October 17, 1999 || Kitt Peak || Spacewatch || CLO || align=right | 3.1 km || 
|-id=482 bgcolor=#E9E9E9
| 189482 ||  || — || October 30, 1999 || Catalina || CSS || — || align=right | 4.3 km || 
|-id=483 bgcolor=#d6d6d6
| 189483 ||  || — || November 5, 1999 || Kitt Peak || Spacewatch || KOR || align=right | 1.8 km || 
|-id=484 bgcolor=#E9E9E9
| 189484 ||  || — || November 14, 1999 || Socorro || LINEAR || GEF || align=right | 2.2 km || 
|-id=485 bgcolor=#fefefe
| 189485 ||  || — || November 14, 1999 || Socorro || LINEAR || — || align=right | 1.3 km || 
|-id=486 bgcolor=#E9E9E9
| 189486 ||  || — || December 5, 1999 || Socorro || LINEAR || — || align=right | 4.2 km || 
|-id=487 bgcolor=#fefefe
| 189487 ||  || — || December 7, 1999 || Socorro || LINEAR || — || align=right | 1.9 km || 
|-id=488 bgcolor=#E9E9E9
| 189488 ||  || — || December 4, 1999 || Catalina || CSS || — || align=right | 5.5 km || 
|-id=489 bgcolor=#d6d6d6
| 189489 ||  || — || December 13, 1999 || Kitt Peak || Spacewatch || — || align=right | 3.5 km || 
|-id=490 bgcolor=#d6d6d6
| 189490 ||  || — || December 13, 1999 || Kitt Peak || Spacewatch || — || align=right | 3.2 km || 
|-id=491 bgcolor=#d6d6d6
| 189491 ||  || — || December 13, 1999 || Kitt Peak || Spacewatch || — || align=right | 7.5 km || 
|-id=492 bgcolor=#d6d6d6
| 189492 ||  || — || December 12, 1999 || Kitt Peak || Spacewatch || — || align=right | 4.9 km || 
|-id=493 bgcolor=#C2FFFF
| 189493 ||  || — || December 7, 1999 || Socorro || LINEAR || L4 || align=right | 21 km || 
|-id=494 bgcolor=#E9E9E9
| 189494 ||  || — || December 19, 1999 || Socorro || LINEAR || — || align=right | 7.5 km || 
|-id=495 bgcolor=#d6d6d6
| 189495 ||  || — || December 30, 1999 || Socorro || LINEAR || — || align=right | 6.3 km || 
|-id=496 bgcolor=#d6d6d6
| 189496 ||  || — || January 3, 2000 || Socorro || LINEAR || — || align=right | 5.5 km || 
|-id=497 bgcolor=#d6d6d6
| 189497 ||  || — || January 5, 2000 || Kitt Peak || Spacewatch || — || align=right | 4.5 km || 
|-id=498 bgcolor=#d6d6d6
| 189498 ||  || — || January 4, 2000 || Socorro || LINEAR || EOS || align=right | 4.6 km || 
|-id=499 bgcolor=#d6d6d6
| 189499 ||  || — || January 3, 2000 || Socorro || LINEAR || — || align=right | 6.7 km || 
|-id=500 bgcolor=#d6d6d6
| 189500 ||  || — || January 5, 2000 || Socorro || LINEAR || — || align=right | 2.8 km || 
|}

189501–189600 

|-bgcolor=#E9E9E9
| 189501 ||  || — || January 7, 2000 || Socorro || LINEAR || — || align=right | 6.6 km || 
|-id=502 bgcolor=#d6d6d6
| 189502 ||  || — || January 8, 2000 || Kitt Peak || Spacewatch || — || align=right | 5.2 km || 
|-id=503 bgcolor=#d6d6d6
| 189503 ||  || — || January 13, 2000 || Kitt Peak || Spacewatch || — || align=right | 3.3 km || 
|-id=504 bgcolor=#d6d6d6
| 189504 ||  || — || February 2, 2000 || Socorro || LINEAR || HYG || align=right | 4.8 km || 
|-id=505 bgcolor=#fefefe
| 189505 ||  || — || February 8, 2000 || Kitt Peak || Spacewatch || — || align=right | 1.2 km || 
|-id=506 bgcolor=#d6d6d6
| 189506 ||  || — || February 2, 2000 || Socorro || LINEAR || — || align=right | 4.8 km || 
|-id=507 bgcolor=#fefefe
| 189507 ||  || — || February 28, 2000 || Kitt Peak || Spacewatch || FLO || align=right data-sort-value="0.98" | 980 m || 
|-id=508 bgcolor=#d6d6d6
| 189508 ||  || — || February 28, 2000 || Kitt Peak || Spacewatch || — || align=right | 3.3 km || 
|-id=509 bgcolor=#d6d6d6
| 189509 ||  || — || February 29, 2000 || Socorro || LINEAR || — || align=right | 3.9 km || 
|-id=510 bgcolor=#fefefe
| 189510 ||  || — || February 29, 2000 || Socorro || LINEAR || FLO || align=right data-sort-value="0.99" | 990 m || 
|-id=511 bgcolor=#d6d6d6
| 189511 ||  || — || February 29, 2000 || Socorro || LINEAR || HYG || align=right | 3.2 km || 
|-id=512 bgcolor=#d6d6d6
| 189512 ||  || — || March 3, 2000 || Kitt Peak || Spacewatch || — || align=right | 5.3 km || 
|-id=513 bgcolor=#fefefe
| 189513 ||  || — || April 5, 2000 || Socorro || LINEAR || — || align=right | 1.2 km || 
|-id=514 bgcolor=#fefefe
| 189514 ||  || — || April 7, 2000 || Socorro || LINEAR || ERI || align=right | 3.1 km || 
|-id=515 bgcolor=#d6d6d6
| 189515 ||  || — || April 5, 2000 || Kitt Peak || Spacewatch || THB || align=right | 6.3 km || 
|-id=516 bgcolor=#fefefe
| 189516 ||  || — || April 6, 2000 || Anderson Mesa || LONEOS || — || align=right | 1.6 km || 
|-id=517 bgcolor=#fefefe
| 189517 ||  || — || April 25, 2000 || Kitt Peak || Spacewatch || NYS || align=right | 1.4 km || 
|-id=518 bgcolor=#fefefe
| 189518 ||  || — || April 26, 2000 || Kitt Peak || Spacewatch || MAS || align=right | 1.1 km || 
|-id=519 bgcolor=#fefefe
| 189519 ||  || — || April 30, 2000 || Anderson Mesa || LONEOS || — || align=right | 1.7 km || 
|-id=520 bgcolor=#fefefe
| 189520 ||  || — || May 28, 2000 || Socorro || LINEAR || KLI || align=right | 3.3 km || 
|-id=521 bgcolor=#fefefe
| 189521 ||  || — || July 30, 2000 || Gnosca || S. Sposetti || H || align=right | 1.1 km || 
|-id=522 bgcolor=#fefefe
| 189522 ||  || — || July 30, 2000 || Socorro || LINEAR || H || align=right data-sort-value="1" | 1000 m || 
|-id=523 bgcolor=#E9E9E9
| 189523 ||  || — || July 30, 2000 || Socorro || LINEAR || — || align=right | 1.7 km || 
|-id=524 bgcolor=#E9E9E9
| 189524 ||  || — || July 30, 2000 || Socorro || LINEAR || — || align=right | 1.5 km || 
|-id=525 bgcolor=#FA8072
| 189525 ||  || — || August 3, 2000 || Socorro || LINEAR || H || align=right | 1.1 km || 
|-id=526 bgcolor=#E9E9E9
| 189526 ||  || — || August 4, 2000 || Bisei SG Center || BATTeRS || — || align=right | 1.9 km || 
|-id=527 bgcolor=#fefefe
| 189527 ||  || — || August 4, 2000 || Socorro || LINEAR || H || align=right data-sort-value="0.90" | 900 m || 
|-id=528 bgcolor=#E9E9E9
| 189528 ||  || — || August 26, 2000 || Socorro || LINEAR || EUN || align=right | 1.9 km || 
|-id=529 bgcolor=#fefefe
| 189529 ||  || — || August 24, 2000 || Socorro || LINEAR || H || align=right | 1.2 km || 
|-id=530 bgcolor=#E9E9E9
| 189530 ||  || — || August 26, 2000 || Socorro || LINEAR || — || align=right | 1.9 km || 
|-id=531 bgcolor=#E9E9E9
| 189531 ||  || — || August 29, 2000 || Socorro || LINEAR || — || align=right | 1.7 km || 
|-id=532 bgcolor=#E9E9E9
| 189532 ||  || — || August 24, 2000 || Socorro || LINEAR || — || align=right | 1.8 km || 
|-id=533 bgcolor=#E9E9E9
| 189533 ||  || — || August 25, 2000 || Socorro || LINEAR || — || align=right | 2.1 km || 
|-id=534 bgcolor=#E9E9E9
| 189534 ||  || — || August 25, 2000 || Socorro || LINEAR || — || align=right | 3.4 km || 
|-id=535 bgcolor=#E9E9E9
| 189535 ||  || — || August 26, 2000 || Socorro || LINEAR || — || align=right | 2.0 km || 
|-id=536 bgcolor=#E9E9E9
| 189536 ||  || — || August 26, 2000 || Socorro || LINEAR || — || align=right | 1.4 km || 
|-id=537 bgcolor=#E9E9E9
| 189537 ||  || — || August 29, 2000 || Socorro || LINEAR || — || align=right | 1.7 km || 
|-id=538 bgcolor=#E9E9E9
| 189538 ||  || — || August 25, 2000 || Socorro || LINEAR || EUN || align=right | 1.6 km || 
|-id=539 bgcolor=#E9E9E9
| 189539 ||  || — || August 31, 2000 || Socorro || LINEAR || — || align=right | 5.1 km || 
|-id=540 bgcolor=#E9E9E9
| 189540 ||  || — || August 31, 2000 || Socorro || LINEAR || — || align=right | 2.0 km || 
|-id=541 bgcolor=#E9E9E9
| 189541 ||  || — || August 31, 2000 || Socorro || LINEAR || — || align=right | 2.2 km || 
|-id=542 bgcolor=#E9E9E9
| 189542 ||  || — || August 20, 2000 || Kitt Peak || Spacewatch || — || align=right | 1.4 km || 
|-id=543 bgcolor=#fefefe
| 189543 || 2000 RH || — || September 1, 2000 || Socorro || LINEAR || H || align=right | 1.2 km || 
|-id=544 bgcolor=#fefefe
| 189544 ||  || — || September 3, 2000 || Socorro || LINEAR || H || align=right data-sort-value="0.98" | 980 m || 
|-id=545 bgcolor=#E9E9E9
| 189545 ||  || — || September 2, 2000 || Socorro || LINEAR || — || align=right | 1.8 km || 
|-id=546 bgcolor=#E9E9E9
| 189546 ||  || — || September 2, 2000 || Socorro || LINEAR || — || align=right | 1.4 km || 
|-id=547 bgcolor=#E9E9E9
| 189547 ||  || — || September 3, 2000 || Socorro || LINEAR || — || align=right | 2.5 km || 
|-id=548 bgcolor=#E9E9E9
| 189548 ||  || — || September 3, 2000 || Socorro || LINEAR || — || align=right | 1.9 km || 
|-id=549 bgcolor=#E9E9E9
| 189549 ||  || — || September 1, 2000 || Socorro || LINEAR || — || align=right | 2.1 km || 
|-id=550 bgcolor=#E9E9E9
| 189550 ||  || — || September 2, 2000 || Socorro || LINEAR || EUN || align=right | 2.1 km || 
|-id=551 bgcolor=#E9E9E9
| 189551 ||  || — || September 2, 2000 || Socorro || LINEAR || — || align=right | 1.9 km || 
|-id=552 bgcolor=#FFC2E0
| 189552 ||  || — || September 6, 2000 || Socorro || LINEAR || AMO +1kmcritical || align=right | 1.6 km || 
|-id=553 bgcolor=#E9E9E9
| 189553 ||  || — || September 20, 2000 || Haleakala || NEAT || — || align=right | 2.4 km || 
|-id=554 bgcolor=#E9E9E9
| 189554 ||  || — || September 23, 2000 || Socorro || LINEAR || — || align=right | 2.1 km || 
|-id=555 bgcolor=#E9E9E9
| 189555 ||  || — || September 24, 2000 || Socorro || LINEAR || — || align=right | 1.5 km || 
|-id=556 bgcolor=#E9E9E9
| 189556 ||  || — || September 23, 2000 || Socorro || LINEAR || — || align=right | 5.0 km || 
|-id=557 bgcolor=#E9E9E9
| 189557 ||  || — || September 24, 2000 || Socorro || LINEAR || — || align=right | 1.5 km || 
|-id=558 bgcolor=#E9E9E9
| 189558 ||  || — || September 24, 2000 || Socorro || LINEAR || — || align=right | 1.7 km || 
|-id=559 bgcolor=#E9E9E9
| 189559 ||  || — || September 22, 2000 || Socorro || LINEAR || MAR || align=right | 1.6 km || 
|-id=560 bgcolor=#E9E9E9
| 189560 ||  || — || September 23, 2000 || Socorro || LINEAR || — || align=right | 2.0 km || 
|-id=561 bgcolor=#E9E9E9
| 189561 ||  || — || September 24, 2000 || Socorro || LINEAR || — || align=right | 1.5 km || 
|-id=562 bgcolor=#E9E9E9
| 189562 ||  || — || September 25, 2000 || Socorro || LINEAR || — || align=right | 1.7 km || 
|-id=563 bgcolor=#E9E9E9
| 189563 ||  || — || September 26, 2000 || Socorro || LINEAR || MIT || align=right | 4.2 km || 
|-id=564 bgcolor=#E9E9E9
| 189564 ||  || — || September 24, 2000 || Socorro || LINEAR || — || align=right | 1.5 km || 
|-id=565 bgcolor=#E9E9E9
| 189565 ||  || — || September 28, 2000 || Socorro || LINEAR || AER || align=right | 2.1 km || 
|-id=566 bgcolor=#E9E9E9
| 189566 ||  || — || September 30, 2000 || Socorro || LINEAR || — || align=right | 1.5 km || 
|-id=567 bgcolor=#E9E9E9
| 189567 ||  || — || September 26, 2000 || Socorro || LINEAR || — || align=right | 2.3 km || 
|-id=568 bgcolor=#E9E9E9
| 189568 ||  || — || September 27, 2000 || Socorro || LINEAR || — || align=right | 2.0 km || 
|-id=569 bgcolor=#E9E9E9
| 189569 ||  || — || September 27, 2000 || Socorro || LINEAR || — || align=right | 1.5 km || 
|-id=570 bgcolor=#E9E9E9
| 189570 ||  || — || September 30, 2000 || Socorro || LINEAR || — || align=right | 2.1 km || 
|-id=571 bgcolor=#E9E9E9
| 189571 ||  || — || September 30, 2000 || Socorro || LINEAR || HNS || align=right | 4.1 km || 
|-id=572 bgcolor=#fefefe
| 189572 ||  || — || September 29, 2000 || Anderson Mesa || LONEOS || H || align=right | 1.1 km || 
|-id=573 bgcolor=#E9E9E9
| 189573 ||  || — || October 2, 2000 || Socorro || LINEAR || — || align=right | 1.7 km || 
|-id=574 bgcolor=#E9E9E9
| 189574 ||  || — || October 1, 2000 || Socorro || LINEAR || — || align=right | 1.8 km || 
|-id=575 bgcolor=#E9E9E9
| 189575 ||  || — || October 24, 2000 || Socorro || LINEAR || — || align=right | 1.8 km || 
|-id=576 bgcolor=#E9E9E9
| 189576 ||  || — || October 25, 2000 || Socorro || LINEAR || — || align=right | 3.2 km || 
|-id=577 bgcolor=#E9E9E9
| 189577 ||  || — || October 24, 2000 || Socorro || LINEAR || — || align=right | 3.3 km || 
|-id=578 bgcolor=#E9E9E9
| 189578 ||  || — || October 25, 2000 || Socorro || LINEAR || — || align=right | 2.5 km || 
|-id=579 bgcolor=#E9E9E9
| 189579 ||  || — || October 25, 2000 || Socorro || LINEAR || HNS || align=right | 2.3 km || 
|-id=580 bgcolor=#E9E9E9
| 189580 ||  || — || October 25, 2000 || Socorro || LINEAR || — || align=right | 1.5 km || 
|-id=581 bgcolor=#E9E9E9
| 189581 ||  || — || October 30, 2000 || Socorro || LINEAR || — || align=right | 1.7 km || 
|-id=582 bgcolor=#E9E9E9
| 189582 ||  || — || November 1, 2000 || Socorro || LINEAR || — || align=right | 1.3 km || 
|-id=583 bgcolor=#E9E9E9
| 189583 ||  || — || November 1, 2000 || Socorro || LINEAR || — || align=right | 1.6 km || 
|-id=584 bgcolor=#E9E9E9
| 189584 ||  || — || November 3, 2000 || Socorro || LINEAR || — || align=right | 1.7 km || 
|-id=585 bgcolor=#E9E9E9
| 189585 ||  || — || November 3, 2000 || Socorro || LINEAR || — || align=right | 2.2 km || 
|-id=586 bgcolor=#E9E9E9
| 189586 ||  || — || November 19, 2000 || Socorro || LINEAR || RAF || align=right | 1.8 km || 
|-id=587 bgcolor=#E9E9E9
| 189587 ||  || — || November 20, 2000 || Socorro || LINEAR || — || align=right | 2.1 km || 
|-id=588 bgcolor=#E9E9E9
| 189588 ||  || — || November 20, 2000 || Socorro || LINEAR || — || align=right | 1.9 km || 
|-id=589 bgcolor=#E9E9E9
| 189589 ||  || — || November 21, 2000 || Socorro || LINEAR || — || align=right | 2.2 km || 
|-id=590 bgcolor=#E9E9E9
| 189590 ||  || — || November 20, 2000 || Socorro || LINEAR || — || align=right | 2.5 km || 
|-id=591 bgcolor=#E9E9E9
| 189591 ||  || — || November 20, 2000 || Socorro || LINEAR || — || align=right | 2.1 km || 
|-id=592 bgcolor=#E9E9E9
| 189592 ||  || — || November 20, 2000 || Socorro || LINEAR || — || align=right | 1.5 km || 
|-id=593 bgcolor=#E9E9E9
| 189593 ||  || — || November 20, 2000 || Socorro || LINEAR || — || align=right | 3.5 km || 
|-id=594 bgcolor=#E9E9E9
| 189594 ||  || — || November 20, 2000 || Socorro || LINEAR || — || align=right | 1.6 km || 
|-id=595 bgcolor=#E9E9E9
| 189595 ||  || — || November 20, 2000 || Socorro || LINEAR || MRX || align=right | 1.9 km || 
|-id=596 bgcolor=#E9E9E9
| 189596 ||  || — || November 21, 2000 || Socorro || LINEAR || — || align=right | 5.9 km || 
|-id=597 bgcolor=#E9E9E9
| 189597 ||  || — || November 20, 2000 || Socorro || LINEAR || — || align=right | 3.4 km || 
|-id=598 bgcolor=#E9E9E9
| 189598 ||  || — || November 20, 2000 || Socorro || LINEAR || — || align=right | 2.4 km || 
|-id=599 bgcolor=#E9E9E9
| 189599 ||  || — || November 30, 2000 || Socorro || LINEAR || — || align=right | 2.0 km || 
|-id=600 bgcolor=#E9E9E9
| 189600 ||  || — || November 21, 2000 || Socorro || LINEAR || MAR || align=right | 2.3 km || 
|}

189601–189700 

|-bgcolor=#E9E9E9
| 189601 ||  || — || November 30, 2000 || Socorro || LINEAR || — || align=right | 2.3 km || 
|-id=602 bgcolor=#E9E9E9
| 189602 ||  || — || December 1, 2000 || Socorro || LINEAR || HNS || align=right | 3.2 km || 
|-id=603 bgcolor=#E9E9E9
| 189603 ||  || — || December 1, 2000 || Socorro || LINEAR || — || align=right | 2.7 km || 
|-id=604 bgcolor=#E9E9E9
| 189604 ||  || — || December 1, 2000 || Socorro || LINEAR || — || align=right | 2.9 km || 
|-id=605 bgcolor=#E9E9E9
| 189605 ||  || — || December 4, 2000 || Socorro || LINEAR || ADE || align=right | 3.6 km || 
|-id=606 bgcolor=#E9E9E9
| 189606 ||  || — || December 4, 2000 || Socorro || LINEAR || RAF || align=right | 2.0 km || 
|-id=607 bgcolor=#E9E9E9
| 189607 ||  || — || December 5, 2000 || Socorro || LINEAR || EUN || align=right | 3.5 km || 
|-id=608 bgcolor=#E9E9E9
| 189608 ||  || — || December 5, 2000 || Socorro || LINEAR || EUN || align=right | 2.4 km || 
|-id=609 bgcolor=#E9E9E9
| 189609 ||  || — || December 5, 2000 || Socorro || LINEAR || — || align=right | 3.4 km || 
|-id=610 bgcolor=#E9E9E9
| 189610 ||  || — || December 30, 2000 || Socorro || LINEAR || WIT || align=right | 2.0 km || 
|-id=611 bgcolor=#E9E9E9
| 189611 ||  || — || December 30, 2000 || Socorro || LINEAR || — || align=right | 4.2 km || 
|-id=612 bgcolor=#E9E9E9
| 189612 ||  || — || December 30, 2000 || Socorro || LINEAR || — || align=right | 4.6 km || 
|-id=613 bgcolor=#E9E9E9
| 189613 ||  || — || December 25, 2000 || Haleakala || NEAT || — || align=right | 2.6 km || 
|-id=614 bgcolor=#E9E9E9
| 189614 ||  || — || December 19, 2000 || Haleakala || NEAT || — || align=right | 4.5 km || 
|-id=615 bgcolor=#E9E9E9
| 189615 ||  || — || January 4, 2001 || Socorro || LINEAR || — || align=right | 2.4 km || 
|-id=616 bgcolor=#C2FFFF
| 189616 ||  || — || January 19, 2001 || Socorro || LINEAR || L4 || align=right | 13 km || 
|-id=617 bgcolor=#d6d6d6
| 189617 ||  || — || January 20, 2001 || Socorro || LINEAR || — || align=right | 5.5 km || 
|-id=618 bgcolor=#d6d6d6
| 189618 ||  || — || January 24, 2001 || Socorro || LINEAR || — || align=right | 6.7 km || 
|-id=619 bgcolor=#E9E9E9
| 189619 ||  || — || January 29, 2001 || Oaxaca || J. M. Roe || AGN || align=right | 2.2 km || 
|-id=620 bgcolor=#E9E9E9
| 189620 ||  || — || January 29, 2001 || Socorro || LINEAR || DOR || align=right | 5.0 km || 
|-id=621 bgcolor=#E9E9E9
| 189621 ||  || — || February 1, 2001 || Socorro || LINEAR || — || align=right | 3.2 km || 
|-id=622 bgcolor=#d6d6d6
| 189622 ||  || — || February 17, 2001 || Socorro || LINEAR || EUP || align=right | 6.0 km || 
|-id=623 bgcolor=#d6d6d6
| 189623 ||  || — || February 19, 2001 || Socorro || LINEAR || — || align=right | 5.1 km || 
|-id=624 bgcolor=#E9E9E9
| 189624 ||  || — || February 22, 2001 || Kitt Peak || Spacewatch || — || align=right | 3.3 km || 
|-id=625 bgcolor=#d6d6d6
| 189625 ||  || — || March 18, 2001 || Anderson Mesa || LONEOS || — || align=right | 5.4 km || 
|-id=626 bgcolor=#fefefe
| 189626 ||  || — || April 26, 2001 || Kitt Peak || Spacewatch || — || align=right | 1.2 km || 
|-id=627 bgcolor=#d6d6d6
| 189627 ||  || — || April 24, 2001 || Socorro || LINEAR || — || align=right | 6.3 km || 
|-id=628 bgcolor=#d6d6d6
| 189628 ||  || — || May 17, 2001 || Socorro || LINEAR || ALA || align=right | 8.5 km || 
|-id=629 bgcolor=#fefefe
| 189629 ||  || — || May 22, 2001 || Socorro || LINEAR || — || align=right | 1.2 km || 
|-id=630 bgcolor=#FFC2E0
| 189630 ||  || — || June 15, 2001 || Palomar || NEAT || APO +1km || align=right data-sort-value="0.97" | 970 m || 
|-id=631 bgcolor=#fefefe
| 189631 ||  || — || June 15, 2001 || Socorro || LINEAR || — || align=right | 1.1 km || 
|-id=632 bgcolor=#fefefe
| 189632 ||  || — || July 13, 2001 || Palomar || NEAT || — || align=right data-sort-value="0.98" | 980 m || 
|-id=633 bgcolor=#fefefe
| 189633 ||  || — || July 17, 2001 || Anderson Mesa || LONEOS || FLO || align=right | 1.2 km || 
|-id=634 bgcolor=#fefefe
| 189634 ||  || — || July 20, 2001 || Socorro || LINEAR || PHO || align=right | 1.7 km || 
|-id=635 bgcolor=#fefefe
| 189635 ||  || — || July 17, 2001 || Haleakala || NEAT || — || align=right | 1.4 km || 
|-id=636 bgcolor=#fefefe
| 189636 ||  || — || July 17, 2001 || Haleakala || NEAT || FLO || align=right data-sort-value="0.98" | 980 m || 
|-id=637 bgcolor=#fefefe
| 189637 ||  || — || July 21, 2001 || Anderson Mesa || LONEOS || — || align=right | 2.1 km || 
|-id=638 bgcolor=#fefefe
| 189638 ||  || — || July 21, 2001 || Anderson Mesa || LONEOS || V || align=right | 1.5 km || 
|-id=639 bgcolor=#fefefe
| 189639 ||  || — || July 16, 2001 || Haleakala || NEAT || — || align=right | 2.5 km || 
|-id=640 bgcolor=#fefefe
| 189640 ||  || — || July 16, 2001 || Anderson Mesa || LONEOS || — || align=right | 1.5 km || 
|-id=641 bgcolor=#fefefe
| 189641 ||  || — || July 16, 2001 || Haleakala || NEAT || ERI || align=right | 2.0 km || 
|-id=642 bgcolor=#fefefe
| 189642 ||  || — || July 22, 2001 || Socorro || LINEAR || V || align=right | 1.1 km || 
|-id=643 bgcolor=#fefefe
| 189643 ||  || — || July 19, 2001 || Anderson Mesa || LONEOS || — || align=right | 1.5 km || 
|-id=644 bgcolor=#fefefe
| 189644 ||  || — || July 19, 2001 || Anderson Mesa || LONEOS || — || align=right | 1.2 km || 
|-id=645 bgcolor=#fefefe
| 189645 ||  || — || July 20, 2001 || Socorro || LINEAR || — || align=right | 1.3 km || 
|-id=646 bgcolor=#fefefe
| 189646 ||  || — || July 25, 2001 || Haleakala || NEAT || — || align=right | 1.1 km || 
|-id=647 bgcolor=#fefefe
| 189647 ||  || — || July 25, 2001 || Haleakala || NEAT || — || align=right | 1.9 km || 
|-id=648 bgcolor=#fefefe
| 189648 ||  || — || July 29, 2001 || Anderson Mesa || LONEOS || — || align=right | 1.8 km || 
|-id=649 bgcolor=#fefefe
| 189649 ||  || — || July 29, 2001 || Socorro || LINEAR || — || align=right | 2.1 km || 
|-id=650 bgcolor=#fefefe
| 189650 ||  || — || July 29, 2001 || Socorro || LINEAR || V || align=right | 1.5 km || 
|-id=651 bgcolor=#fefefe
| 189651 ||  || — || August 6, 2001 || Haleakala || NEAT || — || align=right | 2.2 km || 
|-id=652 bgcolor=#fefefe
| 189652 ||  || — || August 11, 2001 || Haleakala || NEAT || NYS || align=right data-sort-value="0.96" | 960 m || 
|-id=653 bgcolor=#fefefe
| 189653 ||  || — || August 15, 2001 || Haleakala || NEAT || — || align=right | 2.3 km || 
|-id=654 bgcolor=#fefefe
| 189654 ||  || — || August 16, 2001 || Socorro || LINEAR || — || align=right | 3.5 km || 
|-id=655 bgcolor=#fefefe
| 189655 ||  || — || August 16, 2001 || Socorro || LINEAR || — || align=right | 1.3 km || 
|-id=656 bgcolor=#fefefe
| 189656 ||  || — || August 16, 2001 || Socorro || LINEAR || NYS || align=right | 1.2 km || 
|-id=657 bgcolor=#fefefe
| 189657 ||  || — || August 16, 2001 || Socorro || LINEAR || — || align=right | 1.5 km || 
|-id=658 bgcolor=#fefefe
| 189658 ||  || — || August 17, 2001 || Socorro || LINEAR || — || align=right | 1.4 km || 
|-id=659 bgcolor=#fefefe
| 189659 ||  || — || August 17, 2001 || Socorro || LINEAR || — || align=right | 2.1 km || 
|-id=660 bgcolor=#fefefe
| 189660 ||  || — || August 22, 2001 || Socorro || LINEAR || V || align=right | 1.6 km || 
|-id=661 bgcolor=#fefefe
| 189661 ||  || — || August 23, 2001 || Anderson Mesa || LONEOS || — || align=right | 1.3 km || 
|-id=662 bgcolor=#fefefe
| 189662 ||  || — || August 24, 2001 || Socorro || LINEAR || NYS || align=right | 2.6 km || 
|-id=663 bgcolor=#fefefe
| 189663 ||  || — || August 22, 2001 || Kitt Peak || Spacewatch || — || align=right | 1.0 km || 
|-id=664 bgcolor=#fefefe
| 189664 ||  || — || August 24, 2001 || Socorro || LINEAR || — || align=right | 2.4 km || 
|-id=665 bgcolor=#fefefe
| 189665 ||  || — || September 10, 2001 || Desert Eagle || W. K. Y. Yeung || MAS || align=right | 1.3 km || 
|-id=666 bgcolor=#fefefe
| 189666 ||  || — || September 10, 2001 || Socorro || LINEAR || V || align=right | 1.3 km || 
|-id=667 bgcolor=#fefefe
| 189667 ||  || — || September 10, 2001 || Socorro || LINEAR || — || align=right | 1.8 km || 
|-id=668 bgcolor=#fefefe
| 189668 ||  || — || September 12, 2001 || Palomar || NEAT || — || align=right | 1.4 km || 
|-id=669 bgcolor=#fefefe
| 189669 ||  || — || September 11, 2001 || Anderson Mesa || LONEOS || FLO || align=right | 1.1 km || 
|-id=670 bgcolor=#fefefe
| 189670 ||  || — || September 12, 2001 || Socorro || LINEAR || V || align=right data-sort-value="0.94" | 940 m || 
|-id=671 bgcolor=#fefefe
| 189671 ||  || — || September 12, 2001 || Socorro || LINEAR || NYS || align=right data-sort-value="0.94" | 940 m || 
|-id=672 bgcolor=#fefefe
| 189672 ||  || — || September 12, 2001 || Socorro || LINEAR || NYS || align=right | 1.1 km || 
|-id=673 bgcolor=#fefefe
| 189673 ||  || — || September 12, 2001 || Socorro || LINEAR || V || align=right | 1.0 km || 
|-id=674 bgcolor=#fefefe
| 189674 ||  || — || September 16, 2001 || Socorro || LINEAR || — || align=right | 2.1 km || 
|-id=675 bgcolor=#fefefe
| 189675 ||  || — || September 16, 2001 || Socorro || LINEAR || MAS || align=right | 1.0 km || 
|-id=676 bgcolor=#fefefe
| 189676 ||  || — || September 16, 2001 || Socorro || LINEAR || — || align=right | 1.4 km || 
|-id=677 bgcolor=#fefefe
| 189677 ||  || — || September 16, 2001 || Socorro || LINEAR || NYS || align=right | 1.1 km || 
|-id=678 bgcolor=#fefefe
| 189678 ||  || — || September 16, 2001 || Socorro || LINEAR || V || align=right | 1.1 km || 
|-id=679 bgcolor=#fefefe
| 189679 ||  || — || September 16, 2001 || Socorro || LINEAR || — || align=right | 1.3 km || 
|-id=680 bgcolor=#fefefe
| 189680 ||  || — || September 17, 2001 || Socorro || LINEAR || — || align=right | 1.9 km || 
|-id=681 bgcolor=#fefefe
| 189681 ||  || — || September 20, 2001 || Socorro || LINEAR || — || align=right | 1.1 km || 
|-id=682 bgcolor=#fefefe
| 189682 ||  || — || September 20, 2001 || Socorro || LINEAR || V || align=right | 1.0 km || 
|-id=683 bgcolor=#fefefe
| 189683 ||  || — || September 20, 2001 || Socorro || LINEAR || — || align=right | 1.2 km || 
|-id=684 bgcolor=#fefefe
| 189684 ||  || — || September 20, 2001 || Socorro || LINEAR || ERI || align=right | 3.1 km || 
|-id=685 bgcolor=#fefefe
| 189685 ||  || — || September 20, 2001 || Desert Eagle || W. K. Y. Yeung || — || align=right | 1.6 km || 
|-id=686 bgcolor=#fefefe
| 189686 ||  || — || September 16, 2001 || Socorro || LINEAR || MAS || align=right data-sort-value="0.94" | 940 m || 
|-id=687 bgcolor=#fefefe
| 189687 ||  || — || September 16, 2001 || Socorro || LINEAR || V || align=right data-sort-value="0.92" | 920 m || 
|-id=688 bgcolor=#fefefe
| 189688 ||  || — || September 17, 2001 || Socorro || LINEAR || — || align=right | 1.7 km || 
|-id=689 bgcolor=#fefefe
| 189689 ||  || — || September 19, 2001 || Socorro || LINEAR || NYS || align=right | 1.1 km || 
|-id=690 bgcolor=#fefefe
| 189690 ||  || — || September 19, 2001 || Socorro || LINEAR || MAS || align=right data-sort-value="0.89" | 890 m || 
|-id=691 bgcolor=#fefefe
| 189691 ||  || — || September 20, 2001 || Socorro || LINEAR || FLO || align=right | 1.2 km || 
|-id=692 bgcolor=#fefefe
| 189692 ||  || — || September 20, 2001 || Socorro || LINEAR || — || align=right | 1.2 km || 
|-id=693 bgcolor=#fefefe
| 189693 ||  || — || September 27, 2001 || Fountain Hills || C. W. Juels, P. R. Holvorcem || — || align=right | 4.1 km || 
|-id=694 bgcolor=#FA8072
| 189694 ||  || — || September 27, 2001 || Socorro || LINEAR || PHO || align=right | 1.5 km || 
|-id=695 bgcolor=#fefefe
| 189695 ||  || — || September 21, 2001 || Anderson Mesa || LONEOS || FLO || align=right | 1.4 km || 
|-id=696 bgcolor=#fefefe
| 189696 ||  || — || September 21, 2001 || Anderson Mesa || LONEOS || NYS || align=right | 1.4 km || 
|-id=697 bgcolor=#fefefe
| 189697 ||  || — || October 7, 2001 || Palomar || NEAT || NYS || align=right data-sort-value="0.77" | 770 m || 
|-id=698 bgcolor=#fefefe
| 189698 ||  || — || October 14, 2001 || Socorro || LINEAR || NYS || align=right | 1.0 km || 
|-id=699 bgcolor=#fefefe
| 189699 ||  || — || October 14, 2001 || Socorro || LINEAR || — || align=right | 1.1 km || 
|-id=700 bgcolor=#FFC2E0
| 189700 ||  || — || October 14, 2001 || Socorro || LINEAR || AMO || align=right data-sort-value="0.57" | 570 m || 
|}

189701–189800 

|-bgcolor=#fefefe
| 189701 ||  || — || October 13, 2001 || Socorro || LINEAR || NYS || align=right | 1.2 km || 
|-id=702 bgcolor=#d6d6d6
| 189702 ||  || — || October 14, 2001 || Socorro || LINEAR || HIL3:2 || align=right | 7.8 km || 
|-id=703 bgcolor=#fefefe
| 189703 ||  || — || October 14, 2001 || Socorro || LINEAR || NYS || align=right data-sort-value="0.98" | 980 m || 
|-id=704 bgcolor=#fefefe
| 189704 ||  || — || October 14, 2001 || Socorro || LINEAR || FLO || align=right | 1.1 km || 
|-id=705 bgcolor=#fefefe
| 189705 ||  || — || October 15, 2001 || Socorro || LINEAR || — || align=right | 1.9 km || 
|-id=706 bgcolor=#fefefe
| 189706 ||  || — || October 12, 2001 || Haleakala || NEAT || — || align=right | 1.4 km || 
|-id=707 bgcolor=#fefefe
| 189707 ||  || — || October 10, 2001 || Palomar || NEAT || Vfast? || align=right | 1.2 km || 
|-id=708 bgcolor=#fefefe
| 189708 ||  || — || October 10, 2001 || Palomar || NEAT || — || align=right | 1.5 km || 
|-id=709 bgcolor=#fefefe
| 189709 ||  || — || October 10, 2001 || Palomar || NEAT || — || align=right | 1.2 km || 
|-id=710 bgcolor=#fefefe
| 189710 ||  || — || October 15, 2001 || Socorro || LINEAR || — || align=right | 1.2 km || 
|-id=711 bgcolor=#fefefe
| 189711 ||  || — || October 14, 2001 || Socorro || LINEAR || MAS || align=right data-sort-value="0.94" | 940 m || 
|-id=712 bgcolor=#fefefe
| 189712 ||  || — || October 14, 2001 || Socorro || LINEAR || — || align=right | 1.8 km || 
|-id=713 bgcolor=#fefefe
| 189713 ||  || — || October 11, 2001 || Eskridge || Farpoint Obs. || V || align=right data-sort-value="0.95" | 950 m || 
|-id=714 bgcolor=#d6d6d6
| 189714 ||  || — || October 15, 2001 || Palomar || NEAT || HIL3:2 || align=right | 11 km || 
|-id=715 bgcolor=#fefefe
| 189715 ||  || — || October 24, 2001 || Desert Eagle || W. K. Y. Yeung || MAS || align=right | 1.5 km || 
|-id=716 bgcolor=#fefefe
| 189716 ||  || — || October 24, 2001 || Desert Eagle || W. K. Y. Yeung || NYS || align=right | 1.4 km || 
|-id=717 bgcolor=#fefefe
| 189717 ||  || — || October 17, 2001 || Socorro || LINEAR || NYS || align=right | 1.0 km || 
|-id=718 bgcolor=#fefefe
| 189718 ||  || — || October 17, 2001 || Socorro || LINEAR || NYS || align=right | 1.1 km || 
|-id=719 bgcolor=#fefefe
| 189719 ||  || — || October 17, 2001 || Socorro || LINEAR || NYS || align=right data-sort-value="0.94" | 940 m || 
|-id=720 bgcolor=#fefefe
| 189720 ||  || — || October 23, 2001 || Socorro || LINEAR || NYS || align=right | 1.6 km || 
|-id=721 bgcolor=#fefefe
| 189721 ||  || — || October 23, 2001 || Socorro || LINEAR || MAS || align=right | 1.1 km || 
|-id=722 bgcolor=#fefefe
| 189722 ||  || — || October 19, 2001 || Socorro || LINEAR || — || align=right | 1.7 km || 
|-id=723 bgcolor=#fefefe
| 189723 ||  || — || October 24, 2001 || Socorro || LINEAR || — || align=right | 1.8 km || 
|-id=724 bgcolor=#fefefe
| 189724 ||  || — || November 10, 2001 || Socorro || LINEAR || CHL || align=right | 4.3 km || 
|-id=725 bgcolor=#fefefe
| 189725 ||  || — || November 9, 2001 || Socorro || LINEAR || NYS || align=right | 1.2 km || 
|-id=726 bgcolor=#fefefe
| 189726 ||  || — || November 10, 2001 || Socorro || LINEAR || V || align=right | 1.4 km || 
|-id=727 bgcolor=#fefefe
| 189727 ||  || — || November 9, 2001 || Palomar || NEAT || — || align=right | 2.8 km || 
|-id=728 bgcolor=#E9E9E9
| 189728 ||  || — || November 12, 2001 || Socorro || LINEAR || — || align=right | 1.7 km || 
|-id=729 bgcolor=#fefefe
| 189729 ||  || — || November 17, 2001 || Socorro || LINEAR || — || align=right | 2.8 km || 
|-id=730 bgcolor=#fefefe
| 189730 ||  || — || November 17, 2001 || Socorro || LINEAR || — || align=right | 1.7 km || 
|-id=731 bgcolor=#fefefe
| 189731 ||  || — || November 16, 2001 || Palomar || NEAT || — || align=right | 3.4 km || 
|-id=732 bgcolor=#fefefe
| 189732 ||  || — || November 19, 2001 || Socorro || LINEAR || — || align=right | 1.4 km || 
|-id=733 bgcolor=#fefefe
| 189733 ||  || — || December 8, 2001 || Socorro || LINEAR || — || align=right | 6.2 km || 
|-id=734 bgcolor=#fefefe
| 189734 ||  || — || December 9, 2001 || Socorro || LINEAR || — || align=right | 1.5 km || 
|-id=735 bgcolor=#fefefe
| 189735 ||  || — || December 10, 2001 || Socorro || LINEAR || — || align=right | 1.4 km || 
|-id=736 bgcolor=#fefefe
| 189736 ||  || — || December 10, 2001 || Socorro || LINEAR || MAS || align=right | 1.6 km || 
|-id=737 bgcolor=#fefefe
| 189737 ||  || — || December 11, 2001 || Socorro || LINEAR || NYS || align=right | 1.4 km || 
|-id=738 bgcolor=#fefefe
| 189738 ||  || — || December 11, 2001 || Socorro || LINEAR || V || align=right | 1.1 km || 
|-id=739 bgcolor=#fefefe
| 189739 ||  || — || December 11, 2001 || Socorro || LINEAR || NYS || align=right data-sort-value="0.97" | 970 m || 
|-id=740 bgcolor=#fefefe
| 189740 ||  || — || December 11, 2001 || Socorro || LINEAR || V || align=right | 1.2 km || 
|-id=741 bgcolor=#fefefe
| 189741 ||  || — || December 10, 2001 || Socorro || LINEAR || NYS || align=right | 1.1 km || 
|-id=742 bgcolor=#fefefe
| 189742 ||  || — || December 14, 2001 || Socorro || LINEAR || — || align=right | 1.7 km || 
|-id=743 bgcolor=#E9E9E9
| 189743 ||  || — || December 14, 2001 || Socorro || LINEAR || — || align=right | 1.4 km || 
|-id=744 bgcolor=#E9E9E9
| 189744 ||  || — || December 14, 2001 || Socorro || LINEAR || — || align=right | 3.5 km || 
|-id=745 bgcolor=#E9E9E9
| 189745 ||  || — || December 15, 2001 || Socorro || LINEAR || — || align=right | 3.0 km || 
|-id=746 bgcolor=#fefefe
| 189746 ||  || — || December 18, 2001 || Socorro || LINEAR || — || align=right | 2.0 km || 
|-id=747 bgcolor=#fefefe
| 189747 ||  || — || December 18, 2001 || Socorro || LINEAR || — || align=right | 2.1 km || 
|-id=748 bgcolor=#E9E9E9
| 189748 ||  || — || December 18, 2001 || Socorro || LINEAR || — || align=right | 2.2 km || 
|-id=749 bgcolor=#E9E9E9
| 189749 ||  || — || December 18, 2001 || Socorro || LINEAR || — || align=right | 3.5 km || 
|-id=750 bgcolor=#fefefe
| 189750 ||  || — || December 18, 2001 || Socorro || LINEAR || NYS || align=right | 1.3 km || 
|-id=751 bgcolor=#fefefe
| 189751 ||  || — || December 17, 2001 || Socorro || LINEAR || — || align=right | 2.0 km || 
|-id=752 bgcolor=#fefefe
| 189752 ||  || — || December 17, 2001 || Socorro || LINEAR || — || align=right | 1.7 km || 
|-id=753 bgcolor=#E9E9E9
| 189753 ||  || — || December 17, 2001 || Socorro || LINEAR || — || align=right | 3.5 km || 
|-id=754 bgcolor=#fefefe
| 189754 ||  || — || January 9, 2002 || Socorro || LINEAR || — || align=right | 1.8 km || 
|-id=755 bgcolor=#E9E9E9
| 189755 ||  || — || January 9, 2002 || Socorro || LINEAR || — || align=right | 4.1 km || 
|-id=756 bgcolor=#E9E9E9
| 189756 ||  || — || January 9, 2002 || Socorro || LINEAR || HNS || align=right | 2.9 km || 
|-id=757 bgcolor=#fefefe
| 189757 ||  || — || January 9, 2002 || Socorro || LINEAR || — || align=right | 1.7 km || 
|-id=758 bgcolor=#E9E9E9
| 189758 ||  || — || January 8, 2002 || Socorro || LINEAR || — || align=right | 1.8 km || 
|-id=759 bgcolor=#E9E9E9
| 189759 ||  || — || January 9, 2002 || Socorro || LINEAR || — || align=right | 2.0 km || 
|-id=760 bgcolor=#E9E9E9
| 189760 ||  || — || January 9, 2002 || Socorro || LINEAR || — || align=right | 3.1 km || 
|-id=761 bgcolor=#E9E9E9
| 189761 ||  || — || January 14, 2002 || Socorro || LINEAR || HNS || align=right | 2.2 km || 
|-id=762 bgcolor=#E9E9E9
| 189762 ||  || — || January 13, 2002 || Socorro || LINEAR || — || align=right | 1.6 km || 
|-id=763 bgcolor=#E9E9E9
| 189763 ||  || — || January 13, 2002 || Socorro || LINEAR || — || align=right | 1.4 km || 
|-id=764 bgcolor=#fefefe
| 189764 ||  || — || January 12, 2002 || Kitt Peak || Spacewatch || V || align=right | 1.2 km || 
|-id=765 bgcolor=#d6d6d6
| 189765 ||  || — || January 18, 2002 || Socorro || LINEAR || — || align=right | 7.1 km || 
|-id=766 bgcolor=#E9E9E9
| 189766 ||  || — || January 21, 2002 || Palomar || NEAT || HNS || align=right | 2.1 km || 
|-id=767 bgcolor=#E9E9E9
| 189767 ||  || — || February 3, 2002 || Palomar || NEAT || — || align=right | 4.2 km || 
|-id=768 bgcolor=#fefefe
| 189768 ||  || — || February 6, 2002 || Haleakala || NEAT || H || align=right | 1.1 km || 
|-id=769 bgcolor=#E9E9E9
| 189769 ||  || — || February 7, 2002 || Socorro || LINEAR || — || align=right | 4.5 km || 
|-id=770 bgcolor=#E9E9E9
| 189770 ||  || — || February 7, 2002 || Socorro || LINEAR || — || align=right | 2.2 km || 
|-id=771 bgcolor=#E9E9E9
| 189771 ||  || — || February 7, 2002 || Socorro || LINEAR || — || align=right | 4.7 km || 
|-id=772 bgcolor=#C2FFFF
| 189772 ||  || — || February 7, 2002 || Socorro || LINEAR || L4ARK || align=right | 16 km || 
|-id=773 bgcolor=#E9E9E9
| 189773 ||  || — || February 7, 2002 || Socorro || LINEAR || — || align=right | 3.0 km || 
|-id=774 bgcolor=#E9E9E9
| 189774 ||  || — || February 7, 2002 || Socorro || LINEAR || GEF || align=right | 2.1 km || 
|-id=775 bgcolor=#C2FFFF
| 189775 ||  || — || February 7, 2002 || Socorro || LINEAR || L4 || align=right | 13 km || 
|-id=776 bgcolor=#E9E9E9
| 189776 ||  || — || February 8, 2002 || Socorro || LINEAR || — || align=right | 5.2 km || 
|-id=777 bgcolor=#E9E9E9
| 189777 ||  || — || February 10, 2002 || Socorro || LINEAR || — || align=right | 3.8 km || 
|-id=778 bgcolor=#E9E9E9
| 189778 ||  || — || February 10, 2002 || Socorro || LINEAR || — || align=right | 3.0 km || 
|-id=779 bgcolor=#E9E9E9
| 189779 ||  || — || February 10, 2002 || Socorro || LINEAR || — || align=right | 2.0 km || 
|-id=780 bgcolor=#E9E9E9
| 189780 ||  || — || February 8, 2002 || Kitt Peak || Spacewatch || — || align=right | 1.2 km || 
|-id=781 bgcolor=#E9E9E9
| 189781 ||  || — || February 7, 2002 || Palomar || NEAT || DOR || align=right | 5.1 km || 
|-id=782 bgcolor=#E9E9E9
| 189782 ||  || — || February 11, 2002 || Socorro || LINEAR || — || align=right | 1.4 km || 
|-id=783 bgcolor=#E9E9E9
| 189783 ||  || — || February 12, 2002 || Socorro || LINEAR || — || align=right | 4.0 km || 
|-id=784 bgcolor=#fefefe
| 189784 ||  || — || February 19, 2002 || Socorro || LINEAR || H || align=right data-sort-value="0.89" | 890 m || 
|-id=785 bgcolor=#fefefe
| 189785 ||  || — || February 21, 2002 || Socorro || LINEAR || H || align=right | 1.1 km || 
|-id=786 bgcolor=#d6d6d6
| 189786 ||  || — || February 22, 2002 || Socorro || LINEAR || — || align=right | 6.5 km || 
|-id=787 bgcolor=#E9E9E9
| 189787 ||  || — || March 9, 2002 || Bohyunsan || Bohyunsan Obs. || — || align=right | 1.1 km || 
|-id=788 bgcolor=#E9E9E9
| 189788 ||  || — || March 9, 2002 || Socorro || LINEAR || — || align=right | 2.4 km || 
|-id=789 bgcolor=#d6d6d6
| 189789 ||  || — || March 11, 2002 || Palomar || NEAT || — || align=right | 4.4 km || 
|-id=790 bgcolor=#E9E9E9
| 189790 ||  || — || March 12, 2002 || Palomar || NEAT || — || align=right | 3.0 km || 
|-id=791 bgcolor=#E9E9E9
| 189791 ||  || — || March 12, 2002 || Palomar || NEAT || XIZ || align=right | 2.0 km || 
|-id=792 bgcolor=#E9E9E9
| 189792 ||  || — || March 12, 2002 || Palomar || NEAT || — || align=right | 2.7 km || 
|-id=793 bgcolor=#d6d6d6
| 189793 ||  || — || March 15, 2002 || Palomar || NEAT || 615 || align=right | 2.3 km || 
|-id=794 bgcolor=#E9E9E9
| 189794 ||  || — || March 13, 2002 || Socorro || LINEAR || PAD || align=right | 3.7 km || 
|-id=795 bgcolor=#E9E9E9
| 189795 McGehee ||  ||  || March 5, 2002 || Apache Point || SDSS || — || align=right | 3.7 km || 
|-id=796 bgcolor=#E9E9E9
| 189796 ||  || — || April 7, 2002 || Mount Hopkins || T. B. Spahr || — || align=right | 5.0 km || 
|-id=797 bgcolor=#d6d6d6
| 189797 ||  || — || April 5, 2002 || Anderson Mesa || LONEOS || — || align=right | 4.4 km || 
|-id=798 bgcolor=#E9E9E9
| 189798 ||  || — || April 12, 2002 || Socorro || LINEAR || — || align=right | 2.3 km || 
|-id=799 bgcolor=#E9E9E9
| 189799 ||  || — || April 13, 2002 || Kitt Peak || Spacewatch || HOF || align=right | 4.4 km || 
|-id=800 bgcolor=#d6d6d6
| 189800 ||  || — || April 14, 2002 || Socorro || LINEAR || — || align=right | 5.1 km || 
|}

189801–189900 

|-bgcolor=#d6d6d6
| 189801 ||  || — || May 9, 2002 || Socorro || LINEAR || — || align=right | 4.2 km || 
|-id=802 bgcolor=#E9E9E9
| 189802 ||  || — || May 11, 2002 || Socorro || LINEAR || EUN || align=right | 2.5 km || 
|-id=803 bgcolor=#d6d6d6
| 189803 ||  || — || May 11, 2002 || Socorro || LINEAR || — || align=right | 4.7 km || 
|-id=804 bgcolor=#d6d6d6
| 189804 ||  || — || May 7, 2002 || Socorro || LINEAR || ALA || align=right | 5.5 km || 
|-id=805 bgcolor=#d6d6d6
| 189805 ||  || — || May 13, 2002 || Socorro || LINEAR || TRP || align=right | 6.1 km || 
|-id=806 bgcolor=#E9E9E9
| 189806 ||  || — || May 9, 2002 || Palomar || NEAT || AGN || align=right | 2.0 km || 
|-id=807 bgcolor=#d6d6d6
| 189807 ||  || — || May 17, 2002 || Kitt Peak || Spacewatch || — || align=right | 4.8 km || 
|-id=808 bgcolor=#d6d6d6
| 189808 ||  || — || May 30, 2002 || Palomar || NEAT || — || align=right | 5.3 km || 
|-id=809 bgcolor=#d6d6d6
| 189809 ||  || — || June 6, 2002 || Socorro || LINEAR || — || align=right | 5.8 km || 
|-id=810 bgcolor=#d6d6d6
| 189810 ||  || — || June 9, 2002 || Palomar || NEAT || — || align=right | 6.3 km || 
|-id=811 bgcolor=#d6d6d6
| 189811 ||  || — || June 8, 2002 || Socorro || LINEAR || — || align=right | 4.6 km || 
|-id=812 bgcolor=#d6d6d6
| 189812 ||  || — || July 9, 2002 || Campo Imperatore || CINEOS || URS || align=right | 8.3 km || 
|-id=813 bgcolor=#d6d6d6
| 189813 ||  || — || July 4, 2002 || Palomar || NEAT || — || align=right | 4.6 km || 
|-id=814 bgcolor=#d6d6d6
| 189814 ||  || — || July 9, 2002 || Socorro || LINEAR || — || align=right | 6.9 km || 
|-id=815 bgcolor=#d6d6d6
| 189815 ||  || — || July 12, 2002 || Palomar || NEAT || ALA || align=right | 6.3 km || 
|-id=816 bgcolor=#d6d6d6
| 189816 ||  || — || July 13, 2002 || Haleakala || NEAT || — || align=right | 8.8 km || 
|-id=817 bgcolor=#d6d6d6
| 189817 ||  || — || July 8, 2002 || Palomar || NEAT || — || align=right | 6.8 km || 
|-id=818 bgcolor=#d6d6d6
| 189818 ||  || — || July 13, 2002 || Socorro || LINEAR || — || align=right | 9.8 km || 
|-id=819 bgcolor=#d6d6d6
| 189819 ||  || — || July 14, 2002 || Palomar || NEAT || HYG || align=right | 4.9 km || 
|-id=820 bgcolor=#d6d6d6
| 189820 ||  || — || July 20, 2002 || Palomar || NEAT || MEL || align=right | 8.1 km || 
|-id=821 bgcolor=#d6d6d6
| 189821 ||  || — || July 18, 2002 || Socorro || LINEAR || — || align=right | 5.0 km || 
|-id=822 bgcolor=#d6d6d6
| 189822 ||  || — || August 9, 2002 || Socorro || LINEAR || — || align=right | 7.0 km || 
|-id=823 bgcolor=#d6d6d6
| 189823 ||  || — || August 11, 2002 || Palomar || NEAT || EUP || align=right | 6.2 km || 
|-id=824 bgcolor=#d6d6d6
| 189824 ||  || — || August 14, 2002 || Socorro || LINEAR || — || align=right | 7.3 km || 
|-id=825 bgcolor=#d6d6d6
| 189825 ||  || — || August 26, 2002 || Palomar || NEAT || — || align=right | 5.8 km || 
|-id=826 bgcolor=#fefefe
| 189826 ||  || — || September 13, 2002 || Palomar || NEAT || — || align=right data-sort-value="0.84" | 840 m || 
|-id=827 bgcolor=#fefefe
| 189827 ||  || — || October 2, 2002 || Socorro || LINEAR || — || align=right | 1.2 km || 
|-id=828 bgcolor=#fefefe
| 189828 ||  || — || October 10, 2002 || Socorro || LINEAR || — || align=right | 1.3 km || 
|-id=829 bgcolor=#FA8072
| 189829 ||  || — || November 5, 2002 || Socorro || LINEAR || — || align=right data-sort-value="0.75" | 750 m || 
|-id=830 bgcolor=#fefefe
| 189830 ||  || — || November 5, 2002 || Palomar || NEAT || — || align=right | 1.1 km || 
|-id=831 bgcolor=#fefefe
| 189831 ||  || — || November 13, 2002 || Socorro || LINEAR || — || align=right | 1.0 km || 
|-id=832 bgcolor=#fefefe
| 189832 ||  || — || December 5, 2002 || Socorro || LINEAR || FLO || align=right | 1.1 km || 
|-id=833 bgcolor=#fefefe
| 189833 ||  || — || December 5, 2002 || Socorro || LINEAR || — || align=right | 1.3 km || 
|-id=834 bgcolor=#fefefe
| 189834 ||  || — || December 31, 2002 || Socorro || LINEAR || — || align=right | 1.6 km || 
|-id=835 bgcolor=#fefefe
| 189835 ||  || — || December 31, 2002 || Socorro || LINEAR || — || align=right | 1.4 km || 
|-id=836 bgcolor=#fefefe
| 189836 ||  || — || January 4, 2003 || Socorro || LINEAR || — || align=right | 1.5 km || 
|-id=837 bgcolor=#fefefe
| 189837 ||  || — || January 5, 2003 || Socorro || LINEAR || V || align=right data-sort-value="0.95" | 950 m || 
|-id=838 bgcolor=#fefefe
| 189838 ||  || — || January 11, 2003 || Kitt Peak || Spacewatch || LCI || align=right | 1.3 km || 
|-id=839 bgcolor=#fefefe
| 189839 ||  || — || January 4, 2003 || Kitt Peak || DLS || KLI || align=right | 4.0 km || 
|-id=840 bgcolor=#fefefe
| 189840 ||  || — || January 26, 2003 || Anderson Mesa || LONEOS || V || align=right | 1.2 km || 
|-id=841 bgcolor=#fefefe
| 189841 ||  || — || January 26, 2003 || Haleakala || NEAT || NYS || align=right | 1.3 km || 
|-id=842 bgcolor=#fefefe
| 189842 ||  || — || January 27, 2003 || Socorro || LINEAR || V || align=right | 1.00 km || 
|-id=843 bgcolor=#fefefe
| 189843 ||  || — || January 30, 2003 || Anderson Mesa || LONEOS || NYS || align=right | 1.0 km || 
|-id=844 bgcolor=#fefefe
| 189844 ||  || — || February 22, 2003 || Palomar || NEAT || NYS || align=right | 1.1 km || 
|-id=845 bgcolor=#E9E9E9
| 189845 ||  || — || March 6, 2003 || Socorro || LINEAR || — || align=right | 1.8 km || 
|-id=846 bgcolor=#E9E9E9
| 189846 ||  || — || March 6, 2003 || Palomar || NEAT || — || align=right | 2.3 km || 
|-id=847 bgcolor=#E9E9E9
| 189847 ||  || — || March 7, 2003 || Socorro || LINEAR || — || align=right | 1.2 km || 
|-id=848 bgcolor=#E9E9E9
| 189848 Eivissa ||  ||  || March 23, 2003 || Mallorca || OAM Obs. || — || align=right | 2.1 km || 
|-id=849 bgcolor=#E9E9E9
| 189849 ||  || — || March 25, 2003 || Palomar || NEAT || BAR || align=right | 1.8 km || 
|-id=850 bgcolor=#E9E9E9
| 189850 ||  || — || March 26, 2003 || Palomar || NEAT || EUN || align=right | 1.9 km || 
|-id=851 bgcolor=#E9E9E9
| 189851 ||  || — || March 26, 2003 || Palomar || NEAT || EUN || align=right | 2.3 km || 
|-id=852 bgcolor=#E9E9E9
| 189852 ||  || — || March 27, 2003 || Kitt Peak || Spacewatch || — || align=right | 5.0 km || 
|-id=853 bgcolor=#E9E9E9
| 189853 ||  || — || March 31, 2003 || Socorro || LINEAR || MAR || align=right | 1.6 km || 
|-id=854 bgcolor=#E9E9E9
| 189854 ||  || — || March 26, 2003 || Palomar || NEAT || — || align=right | 1.3 km || 
|-id=855 bgcolor=#E9E9E9
| 189855 ||  || — || April 2, 2003 || Socorro || LINEAR || EUN || align=right | 2.2 km || 
|-id=856 bgcolor=#E9E9E9
| 189856 ||  || — || April 5, 2003 || Anderson Mesa || LONEOS || BRG || align=right | 2.6 km || 
|-id=857 bgcolor=#E9E9E9
| 189857 ||  || — || April 4, 2003 || Kvistaberg || UDAS || — || align=right | 2.8 km || 
|-id=858 bgcolor=#E9E9E9
| 189858 ||  || — || April 23, 2003 || Reedy Creek || J. Broughton || — || align=right | 2.8 km || 
|-id=859 bgcolor=#C2FFFF
| 189859 ||  || — || April 24, 2003 || Anderson Mesa || LONEOS || L4 || align=right | 16 km || 
|-id=860 bgcolor=#E9E9E9
| 189860 ||  || — || April 27, 2003 || Anderson Mesa || LONEOS || — || align=right | 2.8 km || 
|-id=861 bgcolor=#E9E9E9
| 189861 ||  || — || April 26, 2003 || Kitt Peak || Spacewatch || — || align=right | 2.1 km || 
|-id=862 bgcolor=#E9E9E9
| 189862 ||  || — || April 28, 2003 || Kitt Peak || Spacewatch || — || align=right | 2.1 km || 
|-id=863 bgcolor=#E9E9E9
| 189863 ||  || — || April 30, 2003 || Kitt Peak || Spacewatch || — || align=right | 3.7 km || 
|-id=864 bgcolor=#E9E9E9
| 189864 ||  || — || May 2, 2003 || Socorro || LINEAR || — || align=right | 3.7 km || 
|-id=865 bgcolor=#FFC2E0
| 189865 || 2003 NC || — || July 1, 2003 || Socorro || LINEAR || APOPHA || align=right data-sort-value="0.50" | 500 m || 
|-id=866 bgcolor=#E9E9E9
| 189866 ||  || — || August 1, 2003 || Haleakala || NEAT || GEF || align=right | 2.3 km || 
|-id=867 bgcolor=#d6d6d6
| 189867 ||  || — || August 19, 2003 || Campo Imperatore || CINEOS || — || align=right | 5.2 km || 
|-id=868 bgcolor=#d6d6d6
| 189868 ||  || — || August 18, 2003 || Haleakala || NEAT || — || align=right | 3.9 km || 
|-id=869 bgcolor=#d6d6d6
| 189869 ||  || — || August 20, 2003 || Palomar || NEAT || — || align=right | 4.2 km || 
|-id=870 bgcolor=#d6d6d6
| 189870 ||  || — || August 22, 2003 || Palomar || NEAT || URS || align=right | 7.1 km || 
|-id=871 bgcolor=#d6d6d6
| 189871 ||  || — || August 20, 2003 || Palomar || NEAT || — || align=right | 5.0 km || 
|-id=872 bgcolor=#d6d6d6
| 189872 ||  || — || August 20, 2003 || Palomar || NEAT || EOS || align=right | 3.2 km || 
|-id=873 bgcolor=#d6d6d6
| 189873 ||  || — || August 21, 2003 || Palomar || NEAT || — || align=right | 5.1 km || 
|-id=874 bgcolor=#d6d6d6
| 189874 ||  || — || August 20, 2003 || Palomar || NEAT || — || align=right | 4.1 km || 
|-id=875 bgcolor=#d6d6d6
| 189875 ||  || — || August 23, 2003 || Socorro || LINEAR || TEL || align=right | 3.5 km || 
|-id=876 bgcolor=#d6d6d6
| 189876 ||  || — || August 23, 2003 || Socorro || LINEAR || — || align=right | 6.0 km || 
|-id=877 bgcolor=#d6d6d6
| 189877 ||  || — || August 28, 2003 || Haleakala || NEAT || — || align=right | 5.2 km || 
|-id=878 bgcolor=#d6d6d6
| 189878 ||  || — || August 30, 2003 || Haleakala || NEAT || — || align=right | 5.3 km || 
|-id=879 bgcolor=#d6d6d6
| 189879 || 2003 RT || — || September 2, 2003 || Socorro || LINEAR || — || align=right | 6.7 km || 
|-id=880 bgcolor=#d6d6d6
| 189880 ||  || — || September 3, 2003 || Haleakala || NEAT || — || align=right | 4.6 km || 
|-id=881 bgcolor=#d6d6d6
| 189881 ||  || — || September 13, 2003 || Haleakala || NEAT || — || align=right | 6.0 km || 
|-id=882 bgcolor=#d6d6d6
| 189882 ||  || — || September 14, 2003 || Haleakala || NEAT || — || align=right | 3.3 km || 
|-id=883 bgcolor=#d6d6d6
| 189883 ||  || — || September 15, 2003 || Haleakala || NEAT || — || align=right | 6.5 km || 
|-id=884 bgcolor=#d6d6d6
| 189884 ||  || — || September 15, 2003 || Haleakala || NEAT || EOS || align=right | 3.2 km || 
|-id=885 bgcolor=#d6d6d6
| 189885 ||  || — || September 15, 2003 || Palomar || NEAT || — || align=right | 7.5 km || 
|-id=886 bgcolor=#d6d6d6
| 189886 ||  || — || September 15, 2003 || Palomar || NEAT || — || align=right | 3.5 km || 
|-id=887 bgcolor=#d6d6d6
| 189887 ||  || — || September 14, 2003 || Haleakala || NEAT || EMA || align=right | 6.7 km || 
|-id=888 bgcolor=#d6d6d6
| 189888 ||  || — || September 17, 2003 || Kvistaberg || UDAS || — || align=right | 4.9 km || 
|-id=889 bgcolor=#d6d6d6
| 189889 ||  || — || September 17, 2003 || Haleakala || NEAT || EOS || align=right | 3.5 km || 
|-id=890 bgcolor=#d6d6d6
| 189890 ||  || — || September 17, 2003 || Haleakala || NEAT || — || align=right | 5.4 km || 
|-id=891 bgcolor=#d6d6d6
| 189891 ||  || — || September 18, 2003 || Palomar || NEAT || — || align=right | 6.0 km || 
|-id=892 bgcolor=#d6d6d6
| 189892 ||  || — || September 18, 2003 || Palomar || NEAT || — || align=right | 4.8 km || 
|-id=893 bgcolor=#d6d6d6
| 189893 ||  || — || September 18, 2003 || Socorro || LINEAR || HYG || align=right | 6.5 km || 
|-id=894 bgcolor=#d6d6d6
| 189894 ||  || — || September 16, 2003 || Palomar || NEAT || — || align=right | 5.7 km || 
|-id=895 bgcolor=#d6d6d6
| 189895 ||  || — || September 16, 2003 || Palomar || NEAT || — || align=right | 6.8 km || 
|-id=896 bgcolor=#d6d6d6
| 189896 ||  || — || September 18, 2003 || Palomar || NEAT || — || align=right | 4.1 km || 
|-id=897 bgcolor=#d6d6d6
| 189897 ||  || — || September 18, 2003 || Palomar || NEAT || — || align=right | 5.2 km || 
|-id=898 bgcolor=#d6d6d6
| 189898 ||  || — || September 16, 2003 || Anderson Mesa || LONEOS || EOS || align=right | 3.4 km || 
|-id=899 bgcolor=#d6d6d6
| 189899 ||  || — || September 16, 2003 || Anderson Mesa || LONEOS || — || align=right | 4.6 km || 
|-id=900 bgcolor=#d6d6d6
| 189900 ||  || — || September 17, 2003 || Kitt Peak || Spacewatch || — || align=right | 4.4 km || 
|}

189901–190000 

|-bgcolor=#d6d6d6
| 189901 ||  || — || September 16, 2003 || Palomar || NEAT || — || align=right | 6.6 km || 
|-id=902 bgcolor=#d6d6d6
| 189902 ||  || — || September 19, 2003 || Palomar || NEAT || — || align=right | 4.1 km || 
|-id=903 bgcolor=#d6d6d6
| 189903 ||  || — || September 19, 2003 || Palomar || NEAT || — || align=right | 4.7 km || 
|-id=904 bgcolor=#d6d6d6
| 189904 ||  || — || September 19, 2003 || Haleakala || NEAT || — || align=right | 3.6 km || 
|-id=905 bgcolor=#d6d6d6
| 189905 ||  || — || September 19, 2003 || Haleakala || NEAT || — || align=right | 3.5 km || 
|-id=906 bgcolor=#d6d6d6
| 189906 ||  || — || September 20, 2003 || Desert Eagle || W. K. Y. Yeung || — || align=right | 4.8 km || 
|-id=907 bgcolor=#d6d6d6
| 189907 ||  || — || September 20, 2003 || Palomar || NEAT || — || align=right | 4.4 km || 
|-id=908 bgcolor=#d6d6d6
| 189908 ||  || — || September 20, 2003 || Kitt Peak || Spacewatch || — || align=right | 3.9 km || 
|-id=909 bgcolor=#d6d6d6
| 189909 ||  || — || September 20, 2003 || Palomar || NEAT || HYG || align=right | 5.3 km || 
|-id=910 bgcolor=#d6d6d6
| 189910 ||  || — || September 20, 2003 || Palomar || NEAT || — || align=right | 5.5 km || 
|-id=911 bgcolor=#d6d6d6
| 189911 ||  || — || September 16, 2003 || Palomar || NEAT || EOS || align=right | 4.8 km || 
|-id=912 bgcolor=#d6d6d6
| 189912 ||  || — || September 16, 2003 || Kitt Peak || Spacewatch || — || align=right | 5.4 km || 
|-id=913 bgcolor=#d6d6d6
| 189913 ||  || — || September 16, 2003 || Palomar || NEAT || EOS || align=right | 3.7 km || 
|-id=914 bgcolor=#d6d6d6
| 189914 ||  || — || September 16, 2003 || Kitt Peak || Spacewatch || THM || align=right | 3.8 km || 
|-id=915 bgcolor=#d6d6d6
| 189915 ||  || — || September 20, 2003 || Socorro || LINEAR || EOS || align=right | 4.0 km || 
|-id=916 bgcolor=#d6d6d6
| 189916 ||  || — || September 19, 2003 || Palomar || NEAT || EOS || align=right | 4.2 km || 
|-id=917 bgcolor=#d6d6d6
| 189917 ||  || — || September 20, 2003 || Campo Imperatore || CINEOS || HYG || align=right | 5.2 km || 
|-id=918 bgcolor=#d6d6d6
| 189918 ||  || — || September 20, 2003 || Socorro || LINEAR || — || align=right | 5.7 km || 
|-id=919 bgcolor=#d6d6d6
| 189919 ||  || — || September 19, 2003 || Palomar || NEAT || EOS || align=right | 4.4 km || 
|-id=920 bgcolor=#d6d6d6
| 189920 ||  || — || September 17, 2003 || Socorro || LINEAR || — || align=right | 3.7 km || 
|-id=921 bgcolor=#d6d6d6
| 189921 ||  || — || September 19, 2003 || Anderson Mesa || LONEOS || LIX || align=right | 5.3 km || 
|-id=922 bgcolor=#d6d6d6
| 189922 ||  || — || September 17, 2003 || Kitt Peak || Spacewatch || HYG || align=right | 5.1 km || 
|-id=923 bgcolor=#d6d6d6
| 189923 ||  || — || September 23, 2003 || Haleakala || NEAT || HYG || align=right | 5.7 km || 
|-id=924 bgcolor=#d6d6d6
| 189924 ||  || — || September 18, 2003 || Socorro || LINEAR || EOS || align=right | 4.0 km || 
|-id=925 bgcolor=#d6d6d6
| 189925 ||  || — || September 18, 2003 || Palomar || NEAT || HYG || align=right | 4.7 km || 
|-id=926 bgcolor=#d6d6d6
| 189926 ||  || — || September 21, 2003 || Socorro || LINEAR || — || align=right | 7.3 km || 
|-id=927 bgcolor=#d6d6d6
| 189927 ||  || — || September 18, 2003 || Palomar || NEAT || — || align=right | 5.6 km || 
|-id=928 bgcolor=#d6d6d6
| 189928 ||  || — || September 19, 2003 || Palomar || NEAT || — || align=right | 6.7 km || 
|-id=929 bgcolor=#d6d6d6
| 189929 ||  || — || September 19, 2003 || Palomar || NEAT || — || align=right | 5.9 km || 
|-id=930 bgcolor=#E9E9E9
| 189930 Jeanneherbert ||  ||  || September 22, 2003 || Junk Bond || D. Healy || — || align=right | 4.6 km || 
|-id=931 bgcolor=#d6d6d6
| 189931 ||  || — || September 22, 2003 || Anderson Mesa || LONEOS || ALA || align=right | 5.9 km || 
|-id=932 bgcolor=#d6d6d6
| 189932 ||  || — || September 22, 2003 || Anderson Mesa || LONEOS || — || align=right | 3.7 km || 
|-id=933 bgcolor=#d6d6d6
| 189933 ||  || — || September 23, 2003 || Palomar || NEAT || TEL || align=right | 2.7 km || 
|-id=934 bgcolor=#d6d6d6
| 189934 ||  || — || September 26, 2003 || Palomar || NEAT || — || align=right | 6.1 km || 
|-id=935 bgcolor=#d6d6d6
| 189935 ||  || — || September 24, 2003 || Palomar || NEAT || — || align=right | 4.3 km || 
|-id=936 bgcolor=#d6d6d6
| 189936 ||  || — || September 28, 2003 || Kitt Peak || Spacewatch || — || align=right | 4.0 km || 
|-id=937 bgcolor=#d6d6d6
| 189937 ||  || — || September 24, 2003 || Haleakala || NEAT || — || align=right | 6.7 km || 
|-id=938 bgcolor=#d6d6d6
| 189938 ||  || — || September 29, 2003 || Socorro || LINEAR || EOS || align=right | 3.4 km || 
|-id=939 bgcolor=#d6d6d6
| 189939 ||  || — || September 20, 2003 || Palomar || NEAT || — || align=right | 5.0 km || 
|-id=940 bgcolor=#d6d6d6
| 189940 ||  || — || September 30, 2003 || Socorro || LINEAR || — || align=right | 7.7 km || 
|-id=941 bgcolor=#d6d6d6
| 189941 ||  || — || September 28, 2003 || Socorro || LINEAR || LIX || align=right | 6.3 km || 
|-id=942 bgcolor=#d6d6d6
| 189942 ||  || — || September 18, 2003 || Haleakala || NEAT || EOS || align=right | 3.7 km || 
|-id=943 bgcolor=#d6d6d6
| 189943 ||  || — || September 18, 2003 || Haleakala || NEAT || — || align=right | 5.8 km || 
|-id=944 bgcolor=#d6d6d6
| 189944 Leblanc || 2003 TX ||  || October 3, 2003 || Wrightwood || J. W. Young || — || align=right | 6.2 km || 
|-id=945 bgcolor=#d6d6d6
| 189945 Teddykareta ||  ||  || October 4, 2003 || Goodricke-Pigott || V. Reddy || — || align=right | 5.1 km || 
|-id=946 bgcolor=#d6d6d6
| 189946 ||  || — || October 14, 2003 || Palomar || NEAT || — || align=right | 6.6 km || 
|-id=947 bgcolor=#d6d6d6
| 189947 ||  || — || October 15, 2003 || Anderson Mesa || LONEOS || — || align=right | 4.6 km || 
|-id=948 bgcolor=#d6d6d6
| 189948 Richswanson ||  ||  || October 16, 2003 || Junk Bond || D. Healy || — || align=right | 3.9 km || 
|-id=949 bgcolor=#d6d6d6
| 189949 ||  || — || October 17, 2003 || Socorro || LINEAR || EUP || align=right | 8.0 km || 
|-id=950 bgcolor=#fefefe
| 189950 ||  || — || October 16, 2003 || Anderson Mesa || LONEOS || H || align=right data-sort-value="0.95" | 950 m || 
|-id=951 bgcolor=#d6d6d6
| 189951 ||  || — || October 22, 2003 || Kvistaberg || UDAS || THM || align=right | 4.3 km || 
|-id=952 bgcolor=#d6d6d6
| 189952 ||  || — || October 16, 2003 || Palomar || NEAT || URS || align=right | 6.8 km || 
|-id=953 bgcolor=#d6d6d6
| 189953 ||  || — || October 19, 2003 || Goodricke-Pigott || R. A. Tucker || EOS || align=right | 2.8 km || 
|-id=954 bgcolor=#d6d6d6
| 189954 ||  || — || October 16, 2003 || Palomar || NEAT || — || align=right | 6.4 km || 
|-id=955 bgcolor=#d6d6d6
| 189955 ||  || — || October 16, 2003 || Palomar || NEAT || — || align=right | 6.0 km || 
|-id=956 bgcolor=#d6d6d6
| 189956 ||  || — || October 16, 2003 || Palomar || NEAT || — || align=right | 5.0 km || 
|-id=957 bgcolor=#d6d6d6
| 189957 ||  || — || October 16, 2003 || Palomar || NEAT || VER || align=right | 6.7 km || 
|-id=958 bgcolor=#d6d6d6
| 189958 ||  || — || October 16, 2003 || Anderson Mesa || LONEOS || EOS || align=right | 3.4 km || 
|-id=959 bgcolor=#d6d6d6
| 189959 ||  || — || October 16, 2003 || Palomar || NEAT || — || align=right | 4.8 km || 
|-id=960 bgcolor=#d6d6d6
| 189960 ||  || — || October 17, 2003 || Anderson Mesa || LONEOS || EOS || align=right | 3.8 km || 
|-id=961 bgcolor=#fefefe
| 189961 ||  || — || October 19, 2003 || Anderson Mesa || LONEOS || H || align=right data-sort-value="0.99" | 990 m || 
|-id=962 bgcolor=#d6d6d6
| 189962 ||  || — || October 20, 2003 || Socorro || LINEAR || — || align=right | 5.9 km || 
|-id=963 bgcolor=#d6d6d6
| 189963 ||  || — || October 18, 2003 || Anderson Mesa || LONEOS || — || align=right | 4.7 km || 
|-id=964 bgcolor=#d6d6d6
| 189964 ||  || — || October 22, 2003 || Kitt Peak || Spacewatch || HYG || align=right | 5.0 km || 
|-id=965 bgcolor=#d6d6d6
| 189965 ||  || — || October 20, 2003 || Socorro || LINEAR || — || align=right | 3.8 km || 
|-id=966 bgcolor=#d6d6d6
| 189966 ||  || — || October 21, 2003 || Socorro || LINEAR || — || align=right | 4.2 km || 
|-id=967 bgcolor=#d6d6d6
| 189967 ||  || — || October 21, 2003 || Kitt Peak || Spacewatch || — || align=right | 4.8 km || 
|-id=968 bgcolor=#d6d6d6
| 189968 ||  || — || October 25, 2003 || Socorro || LINEAR || — || align=right | 4.7 km || 
|-id=969 bgcolor=#d6d6d6
| 189969 ||  || — || October 30, 2003 || Socorro || LINEAR || — || align=right | 7.9 km || 
|-id=970 bgcolor=#d6d6d6
| 189970 ||  || — || November 20, 2003 || Socorro || LINEAR || — || align=right | 5.0 km || 
|-id=971 bgcolor=#d6d6d6
| 189971 ||  || — || November 21, 2003 || Socorro || LINEAR || — || align=right | 3.5 km || 
|-id=972 bgcolor=#fefefe
| 189972 ||  || — || November 29, 2003 || Socorro || LINEAR || H || align=right | 1.2 km || 
|-id=973 bgcolor=#FFC2E0
| 189973 ||  || — || December 13, 2003 || Socorro || LINEAR || AMO +1km || align=right | 1.1 km || 
|-id=974 bgcolor=#d6d6d6
| 189974 ||  || — || December 3, 2003 || Socorro || LINEAR || — || align=right | 5.2 km || 
|-id=975 bgcolor=#E9E9E9
| 189975 ||  || — || December 19, 2003 || Socorro || LINEAR || — || align=right | 3.1 km || 
|-id=976 bgcolor=#d6d6d6
| 189976 ||  || — || January 18, 2004 || Palomar || NEAT || — || align=right | 3.1 km || 
|-id=977 bgcolor=#d6d6d6
| 189977 ||  || — || February 12, 2004 || Kitt Peak || Spacewatch || 3:2 || align=right | 6.2 km || 
|-id=978 bgcolor=#fefefe
| 189978 ||  || — || February 11, 2004 || Palomar || NEAT || — || align=right data-sort-value="0.89" | 890 m || 
|-id=979 bgcolor=#fefefe
| 189979 ||  || — || February 18, 2004 || Haleakala || NEAT || — || align=right | 1.3 km || 
|-id=980 bgcolor=#fefefe
| 189980 ||  || — || February 19, 2004 || Socorro || LINEAR || — || align=right | 1.6 km || 
|-id=981 bgcolor=#fefefe
| 189981 ||  || — || February 17, 2004 || Socorro || LINEAR || — || align=right | 1.2 km || 
|-id=982 bgcolor=#fefefe
| 189982 ||  || — || March 14, 2004 || Kitt Peak || Spacewatch || — || align=right data-sort-value="0.99" | 990 m || 
|-id=983 bgcolor=#fefefe
| 189983 ||  || — || March 15, 2004 || Kitt Peak || Spacewatch || — || align=right | 1.0 km || 
|-id=984 bgcolor=#fefefe
| 189984 ||  || — || March 15, 2004 || Catalina || CSS || FLO || align=right data-sort-value="0.99" | 990 m || 
|-id=985 bgcolor=#fefefe
| 189985 ||  || — || March 16, 2004 || Catalina || CSS || — || align=right | 1.3 km || 
|-id=986 bgcolor=#fefefe
| 189986 ||  || — || March 18, 2004 || Socorro || LINEAR || — || align=right | 1.1 km || 
|-id=987 bgcolor=#fefefe
| 189987 ||  || — || March 19, 2004 || Palomar || NEAT || — || align=right | 1.3 km || 
|-id=988 bgcolor=#fefefe
| 189988 ||  || — || March 23, 2004 || Socorro || LINEAR || — || align=right | 1.3 km || 
|-id=989 bgcolor=#fefefe
| 189989 ||  || — || March 16, 2004 || Socorro || LINEAR || — || align=right | 1.7 km || 
|-id=990 bgcolor=#fefefe
| 189990 ||  || — || March 31, 2004 || Kitt Peak || Spacewatch || V || align=right | 1.2 km || 
|-id=991 bgcolor=#fefefe
| 189991 || 2004 GR || — || April 9, 2004 || Siding Spring || SSS || V || align=right | 1.0 km || 
|-id=992 bgcolor=#fefefe
| 189992 ||  || — || April 12, 2004 || Palomar || NEAT || V || align=right data-sort-value="0.85" | 850 m || 
|-id=993 bgcolor=#fefefe
| 189993 ||  || — || April 12, 2004 || Anderson Mesa || LONEOS || V || align=right data-sort-value="0.94" | 940 m || 
|-id=994 bgcolor=#fefefe
| 189994 ||  || — || April 12, 2004 || Palomar || NEAT || FLO || align=right data-sort-value="0.95" | 950 m || 
|-id=995 bgcolor=#fefefe
| 189995 ||  || — || April 15, 2004 || Catalina || CSS || — || align=right | 1.4 km || 
|-id=996 bgcolor=#fefefe
| 189996 ||  || — || April 14, 2004 || Palomar || NEAT || PHO || align=right | 1.9 km || 
|-id=997 bgcolor=#fefefe
| 189997 ||  || — || April 16, 2004 || Socorro || LINEAR || — || align=right data-sort-value="0.94" | 940 m || 
|-id=998 bgcolor=#fefefe
| 189998 ||  || — || April 16, 2004 || Socorro || LINEAR || NYS || align=right | 1.0 km || 
|-id=999 bgcolor=#fefefe
| 189999 ||  || — || April 19, 2004 || Socorro || LINEAR || — || align=right | 1.2 km || 
|-id=000 bgcolor=#fefefe
| 190000 ||  || — || April 19, 2004 || Socorro || LINEAR || — || align=right | 1.2 km || 
|}

References

External links 
 Discovery Circumstances: Numbered Minor Planets (185001)–(190000) (IAU Minor Planet Center)

0189